= Marrakesh =

City in Marrakesh–Safi, Morocco

Marrakesh مراكش (Arabic) ⵎⵕⵕⴰⴽⵛ (Standard Moroccan Tamazight)
- Prefecture-level city
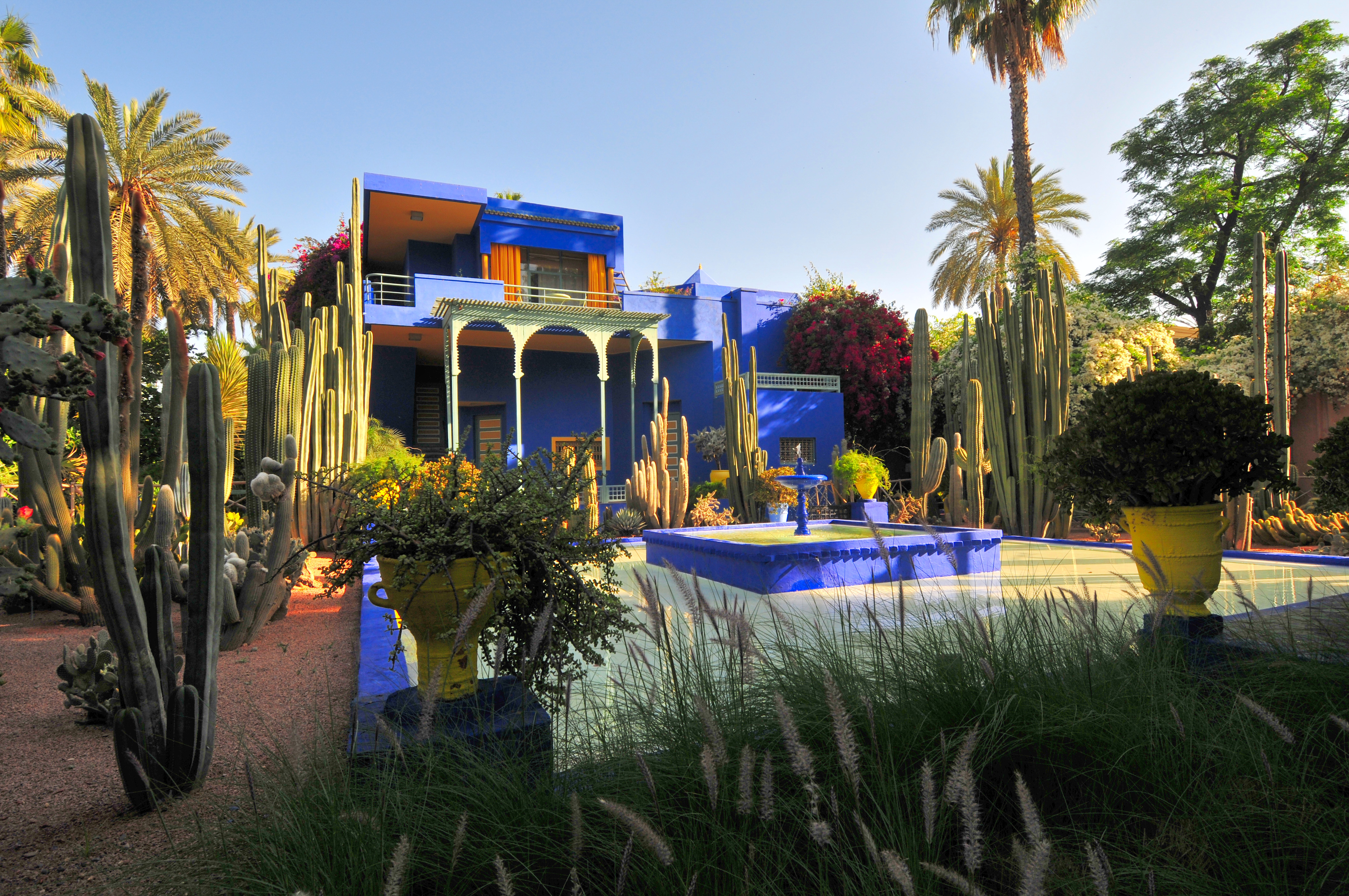
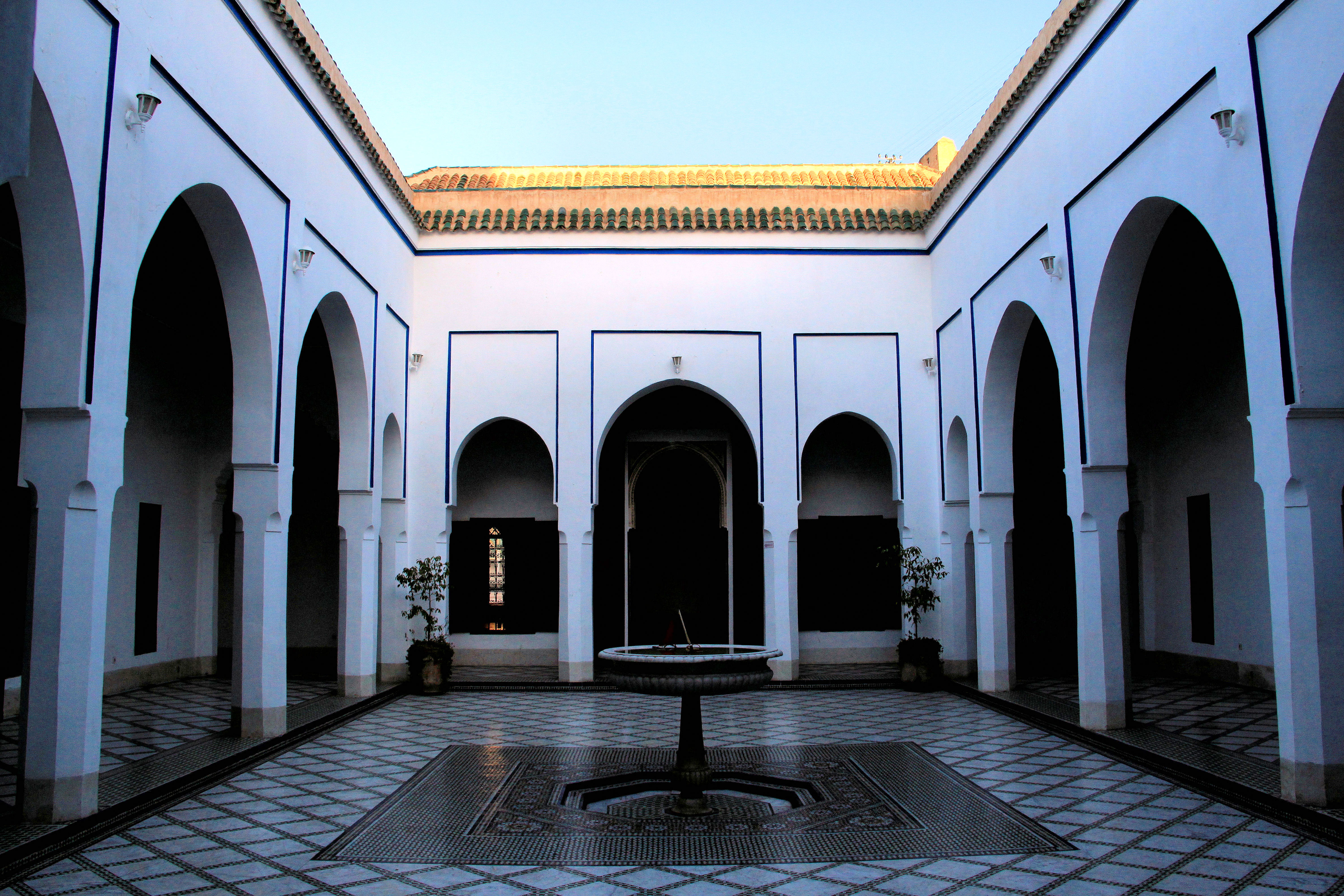
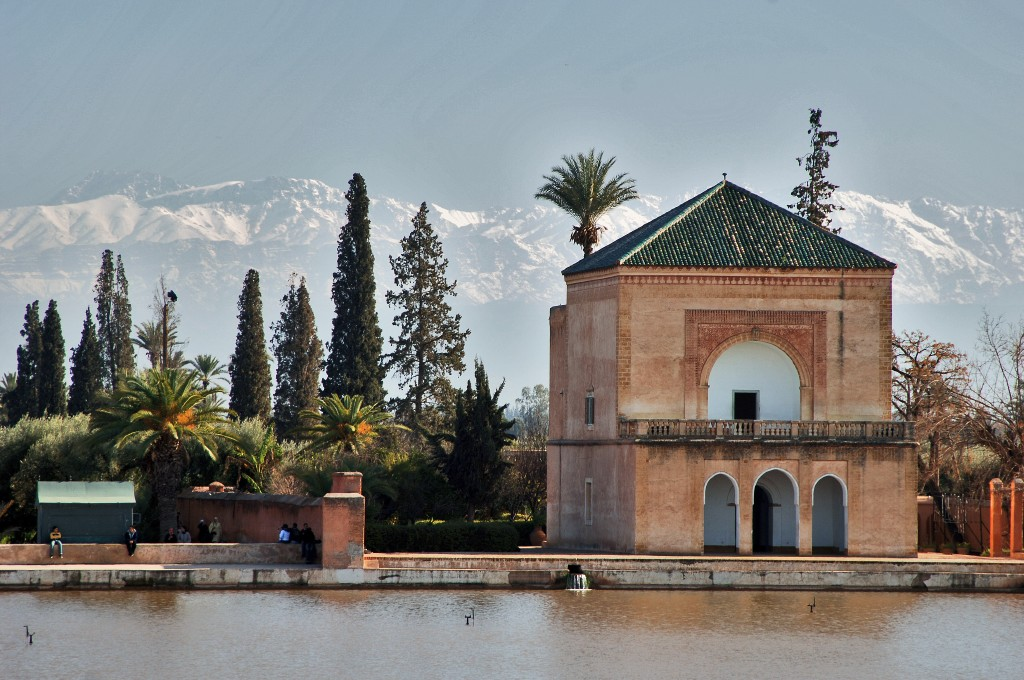
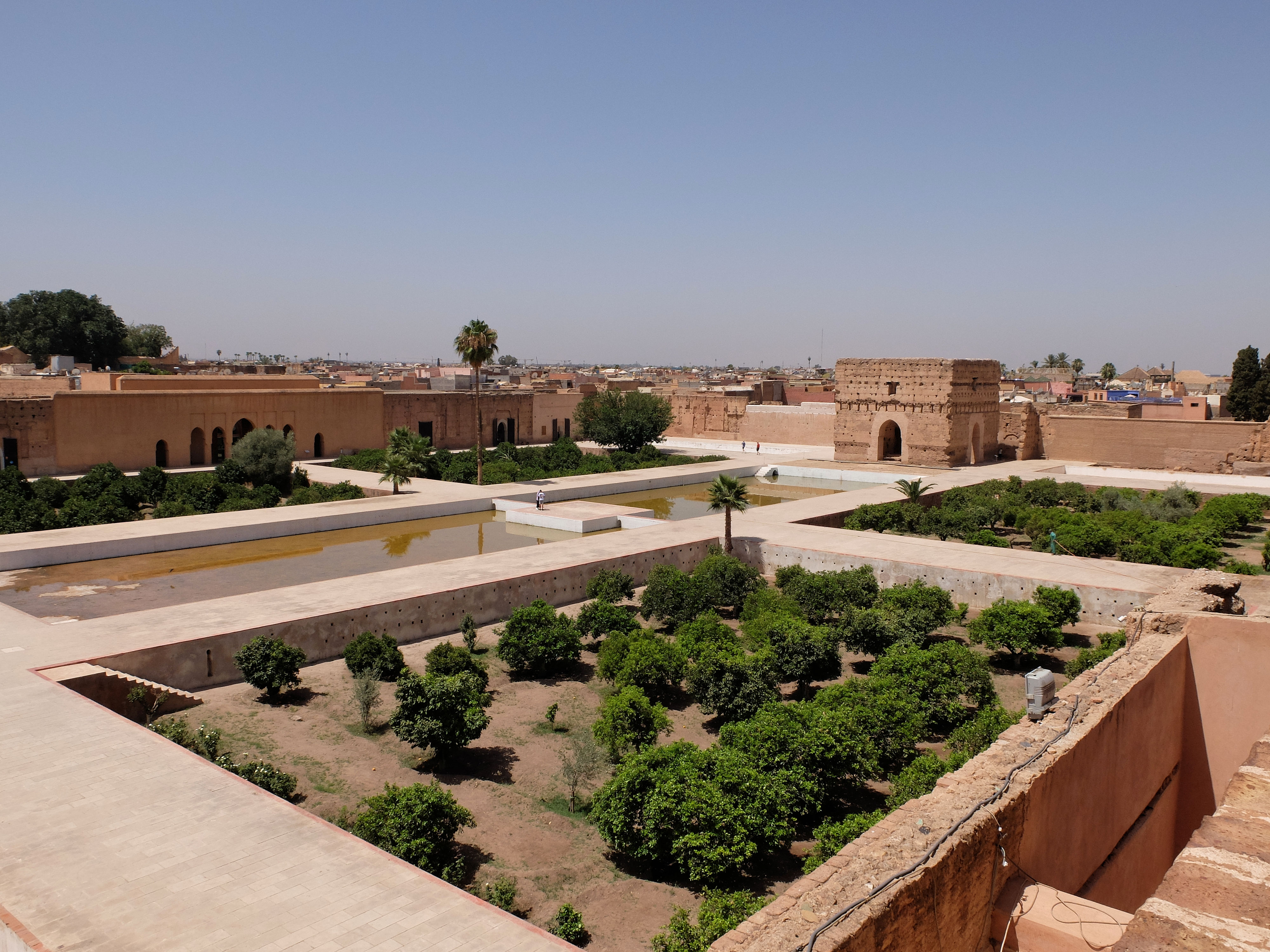
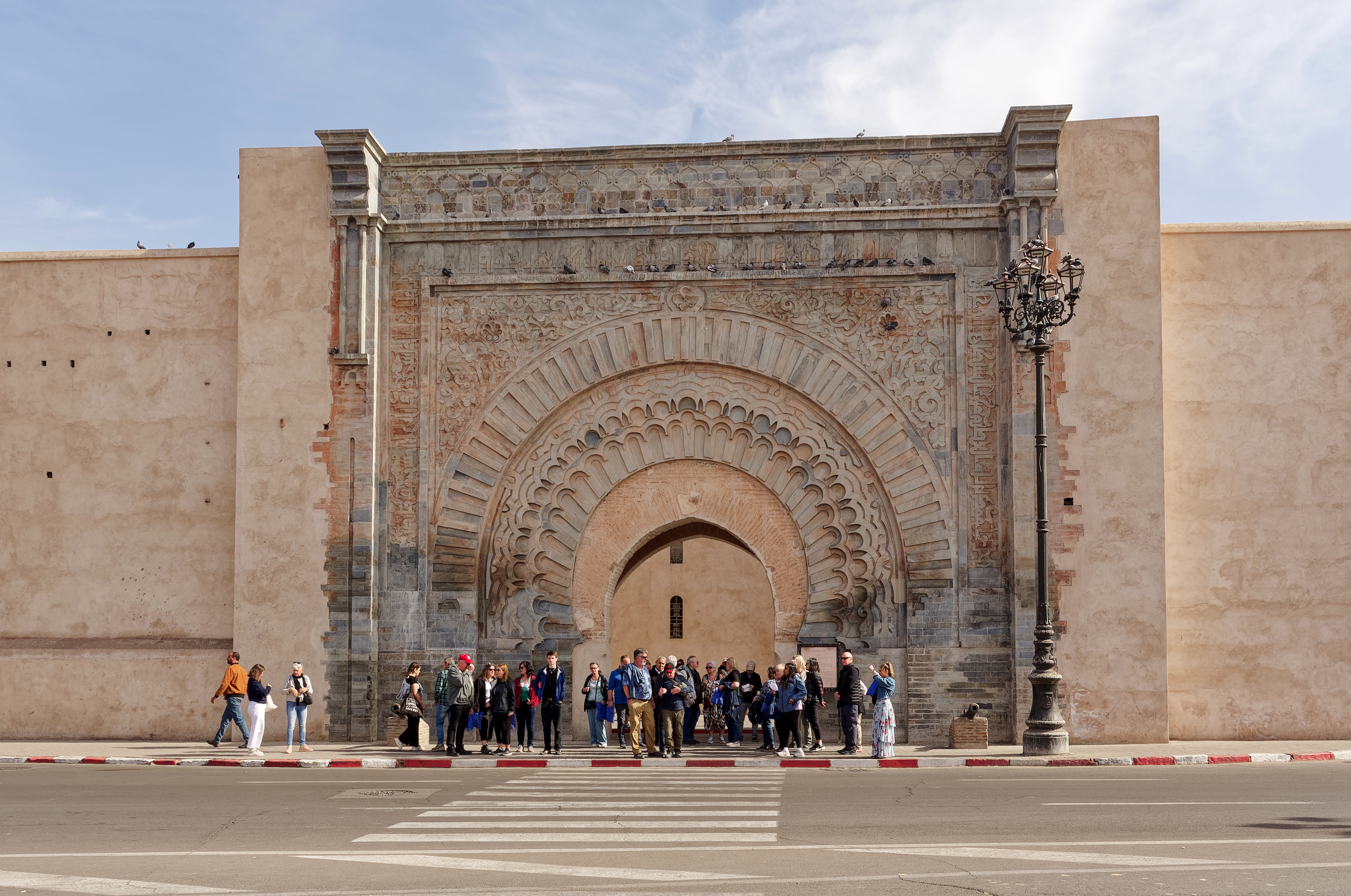
- Jemaa el-Fnaa Kutubiyya Mosque Majorelle Garden Bahia Palace Menara Gardens and the Atlas Mountains El Badi Palace Bab Agnaou
- Interactive map of Marrakesh
- Coordinates: 31°37′48″N 8°0′32″W
- Country: Morocco
- Region: Marrakesh-Safi
- Prefecture: Marrakesh
- Established: 1070
- Founder: Abu Bakr ibn Umar

Government
  - Mayor: Fatima Ezzahra El Mansouri (PAM)

Area
  - Prefecture-level city: 230 km^{2} (89 sq mi)
- Elevation: 466 m (1,529 ft)

Population (2024)
  - Prefecture-level city: 1,571,580
  - Rank: 4th in Morocco
  - Urban (Note: In the 2024 census, the High Commission for Planning gave the legal population of Marrakesh as 1,014,813 which corresponds to the combined population of the municipality of Méchouar-Kasba and the five arrondissements of Annakhil, Gueliz, Marrakech-Médina, Ménara and Sidi Youssef Ben Ali.): 1,014,813
- Demonym: Marrakshi
- Time zone: UTC+0 (GMT)
- Website: ville-marrakech.ma

UNESCO World Heritage Site
- Official name: Medina of Marrakesh
- Criteria: Cultural: i, ii, iv, v
- Reference: 331
- Inscription: 1985 (9th Session)
- Area: 1,107 ha (2,740 acres)

Marrakesh or Marrakech (Note: /məˈrækɛʃ, ˌmærəˈkɛʃ/; Arabic: مراكش, romanized: Murrākuš, pronounced [murraːkuʃ]; Standard Moroccan Tamazight: ⵎⵕⵕⴰⴽⵛ, romanized: Mṛṛakc) is the fourth-largest city in Morocco. It is one of the four imperial cities of Morocco and is the capital of the Marrakesh-Safi region. The city lies west of the foothills of the Atlas Mountains.

The city was founded circa 1070 by Abu Bakr ibn Umar as the capital of the Almoravid dynasty. The Almoravids established the first major structures in the city and shaped its layout for centuries to come. The red walls of the city, built by Ali ibn Yusuf in 1122–1123, and various buildings constructed in red sandstone afterwards, have given the city the nickname of the "Red City" or "Ochre City". Marrakesh grew rapidly and established itself as a cultural, religious, and trading centre for the Maghreb. After a period of decline, Marrakesh regained its status in the early 16th century as the capital of the Saadian dynasty, with sultans Abdallah al-Ghalib and Ahmad al-Mansur embellishing the city with an array of monuments. Beginning in the 17th century, the city became popular among Sufi pilgrims for its seven patron saints who are buried within it. In 1912, the French Protectorate in Morocco was established and T'hami El Glaoui became Pasha of Marrakesh and generally held this position until the independence of Morocco and the reestablishment of the monarchy in 1956.

Marrakesh comprises an old fortified city packed with vendors and their stalls. This medina quarter is a UNESCO World Heritage Site and contains the Jemaa el-Fnaa square, a large number of souks (markets), the Kutubiyya Mosque, and many other historic and cultural sites. The city serves as a major economic centre and tourist destination. Property and hotel development in Marrakesh have grown dramatically in the 21st century. Marrakesh is particularly popular with the French, and numerous French celebrities own property in the city.

Marrakesh is served by Marrakesh Menara Airport and by Marrakesh railway station, which connects the city to Casablanca and northern Morocco. Marrakesh has several universities and schools, including Cadi Ayyad University. The most visited city in the country, Marrakesh has become a major destination for tourism.

== Etymology ==
The exact meaning of the name is debated. One possible origin of the name Marrakesh is from the Berber (Amazigh) words amur n akuc, which means "Land of God". According to historian Susan Searight, however, the town's name was first documented in an 11th-century manuscript in the Qarawiyyin library in Fez, where its meaning was given as "country of the sons of Kush". The word mur is used now in Berber mostly in the feminine form tamurt. The same word "mur" appears in Mauretania, the North African kingdom from antiquity, although the link remains controversial as this name possibly originates from μαύρος mauros, the ancient Greek word for "dark". The common English spelling is "Marrakesh", although "Marrakech" (the French spelling) is also widely used. The name is spelled Mṛṛakc in the Berber Latin alphabet, Marraquexe in Portuguese, Marrakech in Spanish. A typical pronunciation in Moroccan Arabic is Marrākš (/mərˈraːkʃ/) with stress on the second syllable.

From medieval times until around the beginning of the 20th century, the entire country of Morocco was known as the "Kingdom of Marrakesh", as the kingdom's historic capital city was often Marrakesh. The name for Morocco is still "Marrakesh" to this day in Persian and Urdu as well as many other South Asian languages. Various European names for Morocco (Marruecos, Marrocos, Maroc, Marokko, etc.) are directly derived from the name Murrākuš. Conversely, the city itself was in earlier times simply called Marocco City (or similar) by travelers from abroad.

The name of the city and the country diverged after the Treaty of Fez divided Morocco into a French protectorate in Morocco and Spanish protectorate in Morocco, and the old interchangeable usage lasted widely until about the interregnum of Mohammed Ben Aarafa (1953–1955). The latter episode set in motion the country's return to independence, when Morocco officially became المملكة المغربية (al-Mamlaka al-Maḡribiyya, "The Maghreb Kingdom"), its name no longer referring to the city of Marrakesh. Marrakesh is known by a variety of nicknames, including the "Red City" (Arabic: المدينة الحمراء, romanized: al-Madīnat al-Ḥamrāʾ), the "Ochre City" and "the Daughter of the Desert", and has been the focus of poetic analogies such as one comparing the city to "a drum that beats an African identity into the complex soul of Morocco."

== History ==
The Marrakesh area was inhabited by Berber farmers from Neolithic times, and numerous stone implements have been unearthed in the area. Marrakesh was founded by Abu Bakr ibn Umar, chieftain and second cousin of the Almoravid king Yusuf ibn Tashfin (c. 1061–1106). Historical sources cite a variety of dates for this event ranging between 1062 (454 in the Hijri calendar), according to Ibn Abi Zar and Ibn Khaldun, and 1078 (470 AH), according to Muhammad al-Idrisi. The date most commonly used by modern historians is 1070, although 1062 is still cited by some writers.

=== Imperial capital ===
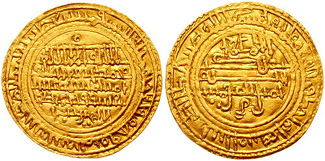
Gold Almoravid dinar minted during the reign of Ali ibn Yusuf

The Almoravids, a Berber dynasty seeking to reform Islamic society, ruled an emirate stretching from the edge of Senegal to the centre of Spain and from the Atlantic coast to Algiers. They used Marrakesh as their capital and established its first structures, including mosques and a fortified residence, the Ksar al-Hajjar, near the present-day Kutubiyya Mosque. These Almoravid foundations also influenced the layout and urban organization of the city for centuries to come. For example, the present-day Jemaa el-Fnaa originated from a public square in front of the Almoravid palace gates, the Rahbat al-Ksar, and the major souks (markets) of the city developed roughly in the area between this square and the city's main mosque, where they remain today.

The city developed the community into a trading centre for the Maghreb and sub-Saharan Africa. It grew rapidly and established itself as a cultural and religious centre, supplanting Aghmat, which had long been the capital of Haouz. Andalusi craftsmen from Cordoba and Seville built and decorated numerous monuments, importing the Cordoban Umayyad style characterised by carved domes and cusped arches. This Andalusian influence merged with designs from the Sahara and West Africa, creating a unique style of architecture which was fully adapted to the Marrakesh environment. Yusuf ibn Tashfin built houses, minted coins, and brought gold and silver to the city in caravans. His son and successor, Ali Ibn Yusuf, built the Ben Youssef Mosque, the city's main mosque, between 1120 and 1132. He also fortified the city with city walls for the first time in 1126–1127 and expanded its water supply by creating the underground water system known as the khettara.

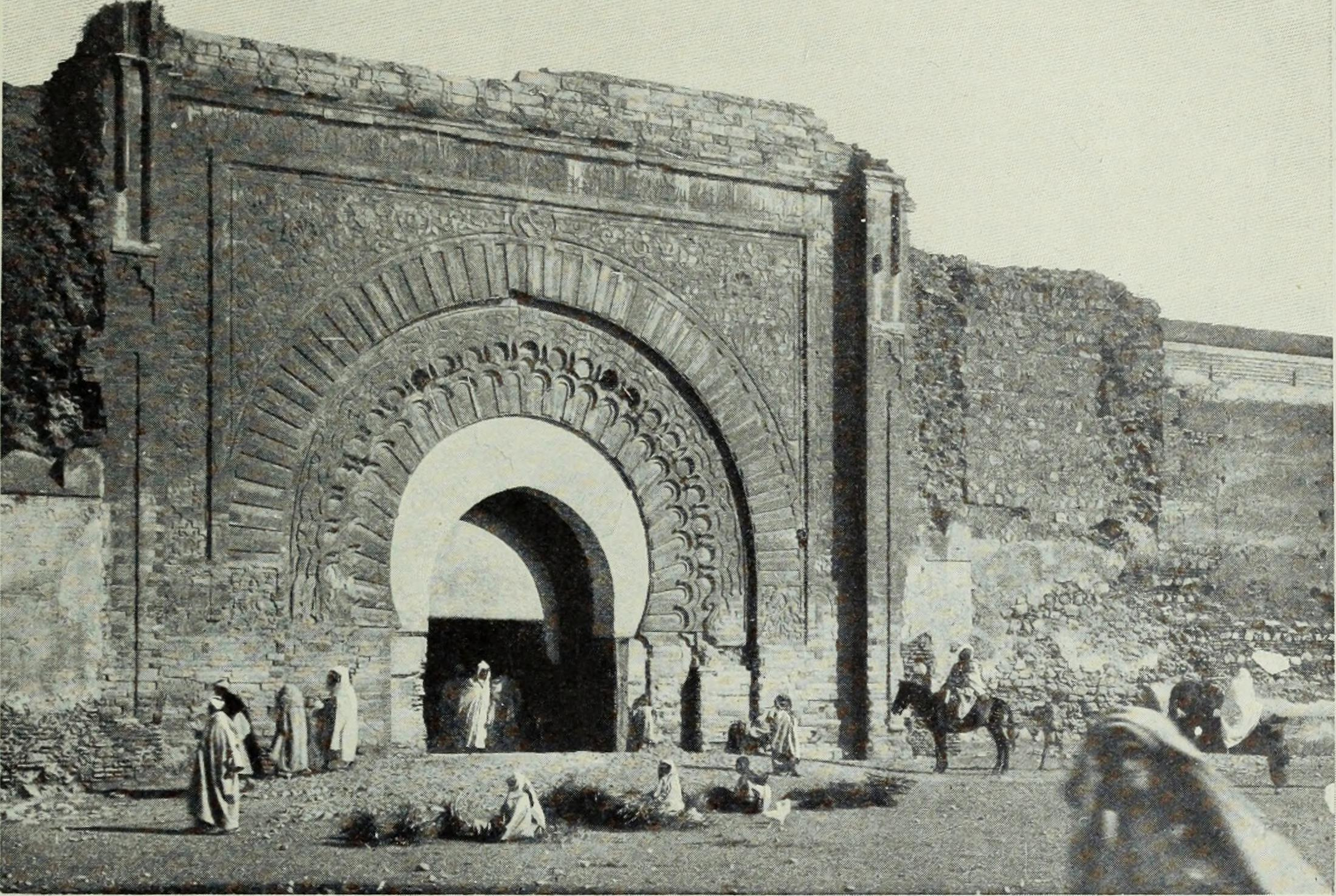
Bab Agnaou, the Almohad-era gate of the Kasbah (photo c. 1890)

In 1125, the preacher Ibn Tumart settled in Tin Mal in the mountains to the south of Marrakesh, founding the Almohad movement. This new faction, composed mainly of Masmuda tribesmen, followed a doctrine of radical reform with Ibn Tumart as the mahdi, a messianic figure. He preached against the Almoravids and influenced a revolt which succeeded in bringing about the fall of nearby Aghmat, but stopped short of bringing down Marrakesh following an unsuccessful siege in 1130. Ibn Tumart died shortly after in the same year, but his successor Abd al-Mu'min took over the political leadership of the movement and captured Marrakesh in 1147 after a siege of several months. The Almohads purged the Almoravid population over three days and established the city as their new capital. They went on to take over much of the Almoravids' former territory in Africa and the Iberian Peninsula. In 1147, shortly after the city's conquest, Abd al-Mu'min founded the Kutubiyya Mosque (or Koutoubia Mosque), next to the former Almoravid palace, to serve as the city's new main mosque. The Almoravid mosques were either demolished or abandoned as the Almohads enacted their religious reforms. Abd al-Mu'min was also responsible for establishing the Menara Gardens in 1157, while his successor Abu Ya'qub Yusuf (r. 1163–1184) began the Agdal Gardens. Ya'qub al-Mansur (r. 1184–1199), possibly on the orders of his father Abu Ya'qub Yusuf, was responsible for building the Kasbah, a citadel and palace district on the south side of the city. The Kasbah housed the center of government and the residence of the caliph, a title borne by the Almohad rulers to rival the eastern Abbasid Caliphate. In part because of these various additions, the Almohads also improved the water supply system and created water reservoirs to irrigate their gardens. Thanks to its economic, political, and cultural importance, Marrakesh hosted many writers, artists, and intellectuals, many of them from Al-Andalus, including the famous philosopher Averroes of Cordoba.

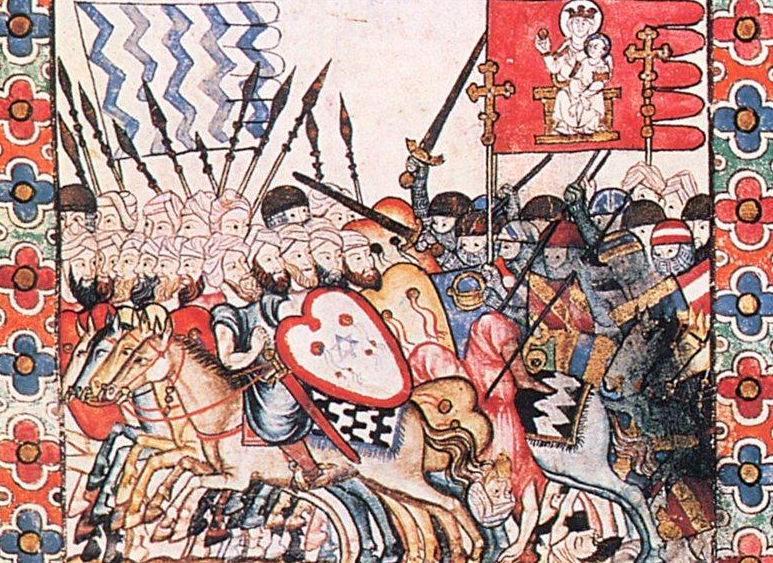
Detail of the Cantiga de Santa Maria #181. The cantiga #181 depicts the successful 1261–62 defence of Marrakesh by Almohad ruler Al-Murtada (with help from Christian militias) from the siege laid on by Marinid ruler Abu Yusuf.

The death of Yusuf II in 1224 began a period of instability. Marrakesh became the stronghold of the Almohad tribal sheikhs and the ahl ad-dar (descendants of Ibn Tumart), who sought to claw power back from the ruling Almohad family. Marrakesh was taken, lost and retaken by force multiple times by a stream of caliphs and pretenders, such as during the brutal seizure of Marrakesh by the Sevillan caliph Abd al-Wahid II al-Ma'mun in 1226, which was followed by a massacre of the Almohad tribal sheikhs and their families and a public denunciation of Ibn Tumart's doctrines by the caliph from the pulpit of the Kasbah Mosque. After al-Ma'mun's death in 1232, his widow attempted to forcibly install her son, acquiring the support of the Almohad army chiefs and Spanish mercenaries with the promise to hand Marrakesh over to them for the sack. Hearing of the terms, the people of Marrakesh sought to make an agreement with the military captains and saved the city from destruction with a sizable payoff of 500,000 dinars. In 1269, Marrakesh was conquered by the Marinids, a Zenata tribe who overran the Almohads in Morocco. While Marrakesh remained a major city, it lost its capital status to Fez and underwent a period of relative decline.

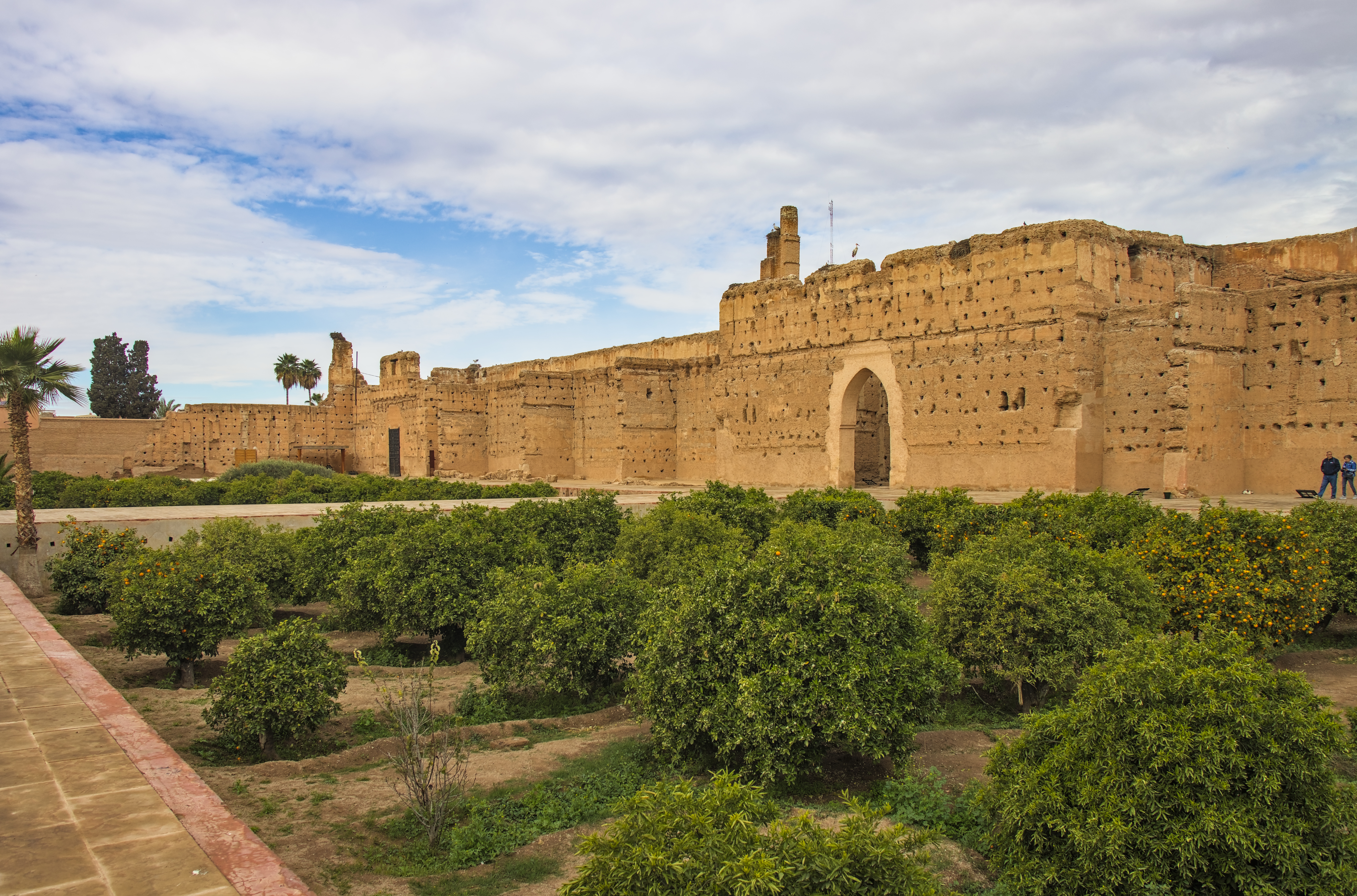
El Badi Palace, built by the Saadi sultan Ahmad al-Mansur (16th century)

=== Saadi period ===
In the early 16th century, Marrakesh again became the capital of Morocco. After a period when it was the seat of the Hintata emirs, it reestablished its status during the reigns of the Saadian sultans Abdallah al-Ghalib and Ahmad al-Mansur. Under the Saadian dynasty, Marrakesh experienced a new golden age. Thanks to the wealth amassed by the sultans, it was embellished with sumptuous palaces while its ruined monuments were restored. El Badi Palace, begun by Ahmad al-Mansur in 1578, was made with costly materials including marble from Italy. The palace was intended primarily for hosting lavish receptions for ambassadors from Spain, England, and the Ottoman Empire, showcasing Saadian Morocco as a nation whose power and influence reached as far as the borders of Niger and Mali.

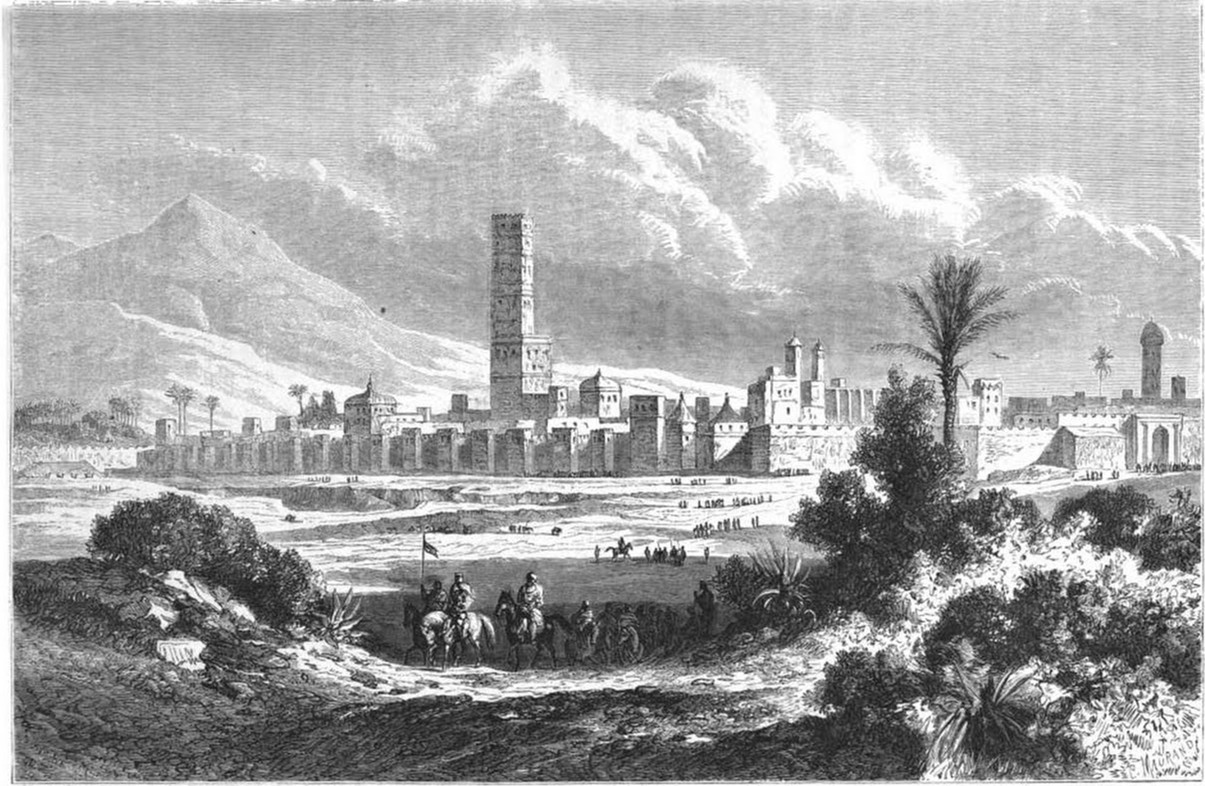
Litography depicting the city of Marrakesh, in 1860 by Évremond de Bérard.

For centuries Marrakesh has been known as the location of the tombs of Morocco's seven patron saints (سبعة رجال sabʿatu rijāl). When sufism was at the height of its popularity during the late 17th-century reign of Moulay Ismail, the festival of these saints was founded by Abu Ali al-Hassan al-Yusi at the request of the sultan. The tombs of several renowned figures were moved to Marrakesh to attract pilgrims, and the pilgrimage associated with the seven saints is now a firmly established institution. Pilgrims visit the tombs of the saints in a specific order, as follows: Sidi Yusuf Ali Sanhaji (1196–97), a leper; Qadi Iyyad or qadi of Ceuta (1083–1149), a theologian and author of Ash-Shifa (treatises on the virtues of Muhammad); Sidi Bel Abbas (1130–1204), known as the patron saint of the city and most revered in the region; Sidi Muhammad al-Jazuli (1465), a well known Sufi who founded the Jazuli brotherhood; Abdelaziz al-Tebaa (1508), a student of al-Jazuli; Abdallah al-Ghazwani (1528), known as Moulay al-Ksour; and Sidi Abu al-Qasim Al-Suhayli, (1185), also known as Imam al-Suhayli. Until 1867, European Christians were not authorized to enter the city unless they acquired special permission from the sultan; east European Jews were permitted.

=== 20th century ===
In the early 20th century, Marrakesh underwent several years of unrest as Morocco was plagued by anarchy, tribal revolts, the plotting of feudal lords, and European intrigues. After the death in 1900 of the grand vizier Ba Ahmed, who had been designated regent until the designated sultan Abd al-Aziz became of age, and the 1906 Algeciras Conference, which limited Moroccan sovereignty, southern aristocrats, including powerful Amazigh tribal leaders of the High Atlas, pledged their allegiance to the caliph of Marrakesh Moulay Abd al-Hafid as Sultan of Morocco over his brother Abd al-Aziz in 1907, which started the Hafidiya. It was also in 1907 that Émile Mauchamp, a French physician and informant, was murdered in Marrakesh, suspected of spying for his country. France used the event as a pretext for sending its troops from Algeria to the eastern Moroccan town of Oujda, marking the beginning of the French conquest of Morocco. As the French forces advanced, they encountered strong resistance from Ahmed al-Hiba, a son of Sheikh Ma al-'Aynayn, who arrived from the Sahara accompanied by his nomadic Reguibat tribal warriors. On 30 March 1912, the French Protectorate in Morocco was established. After the Battle of Sidi Bou Othman, which saw the victory of the French Mangin column over the al-Hiba forces in September 1912, the French seized Marrakesh. The conquest was facilitated by the rallying of the Imzwarn tribes and their leaders from the powerful Glaoui family, leading to a massacre of Marrakesh citizens in the resulting turmoil.

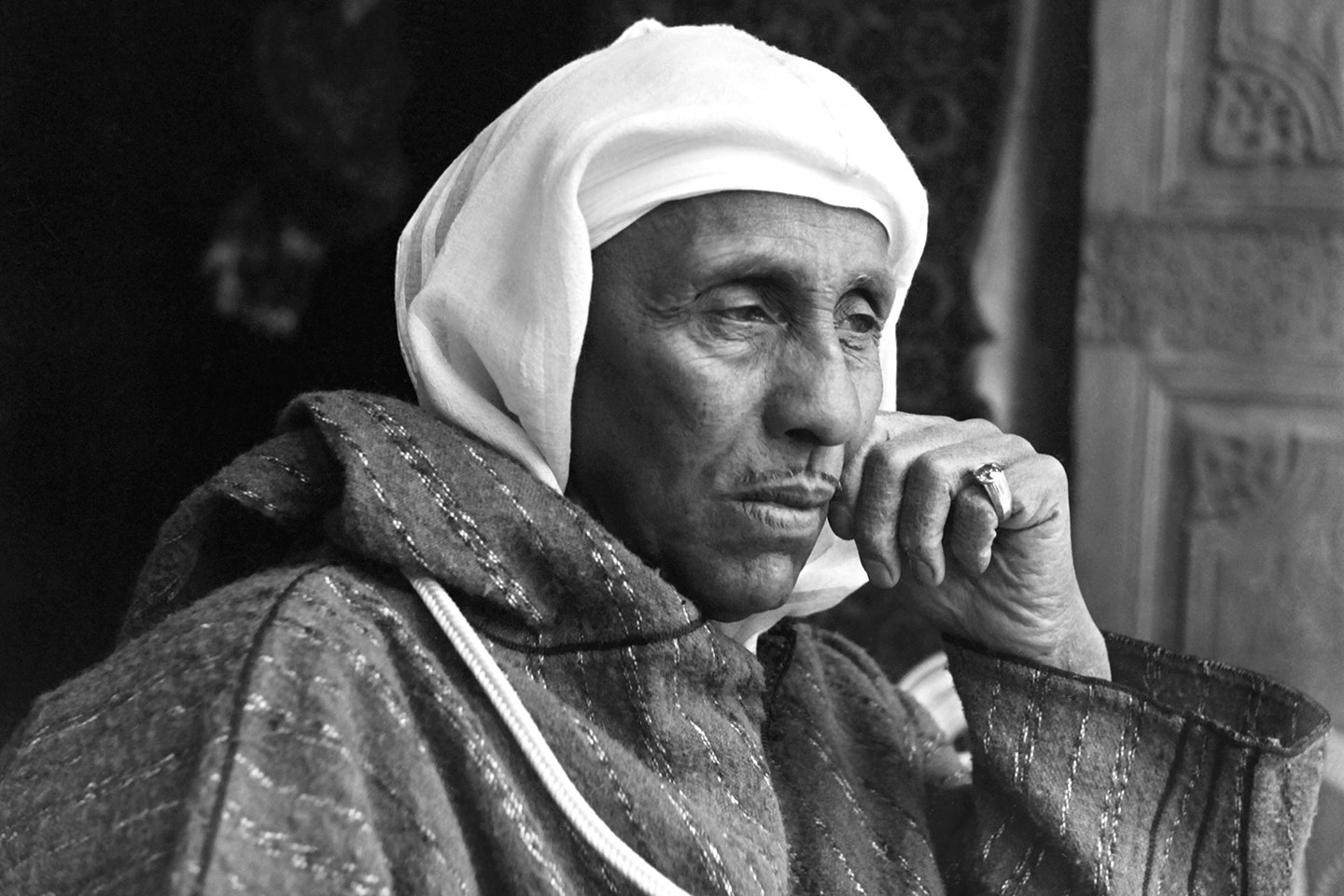
T'hami El Glaoui, Pasha of Marrakesh (1912 to 1956)

T'hami El Glaoui, known as "Lord of the Atlas", became Pasha of Marrakesh, a post he held virtually throughout the 44-year duration of the Protectorate (1912–1956). Glaoui dominated the city and became famous for his collaboration with the general residence authorities, culminating in a plot to dethrone Mohammed Ben Youssef (Mohammed V) and replace him with the Sultan's cousin, Ben Arafa. Glaoui, already known for his amorous adventures and lavish lifestyle, became a symbol of Morocco's colonial order. He could not, however, subdue the rise of nationalist sentiment, nor the hostility of a growing proportion of the inhabitants. Nor could he resist pressure from France, who agreed to terminate its Moroccan Protectorate in 1956 due to the launch of the Algerian War (1954–1962) immediately following the end of the war in Indochina (1946–1954), in which Moroccans had been conscripted to fight in Vietnam on behalf of the French Army. After two successive exiles to Corsica and Madagascar, Mohammed Ben Youssef was allowed to return to Morocco in November 1955, bringing an end to the despotic rule of Glaoui over Marrakesh and the surrounding region. A protocol giving independence to Morocco was then signed on 2 March 1956 between French Foreign Minister Christian Pineau and M’Barek Ben Bakkai.

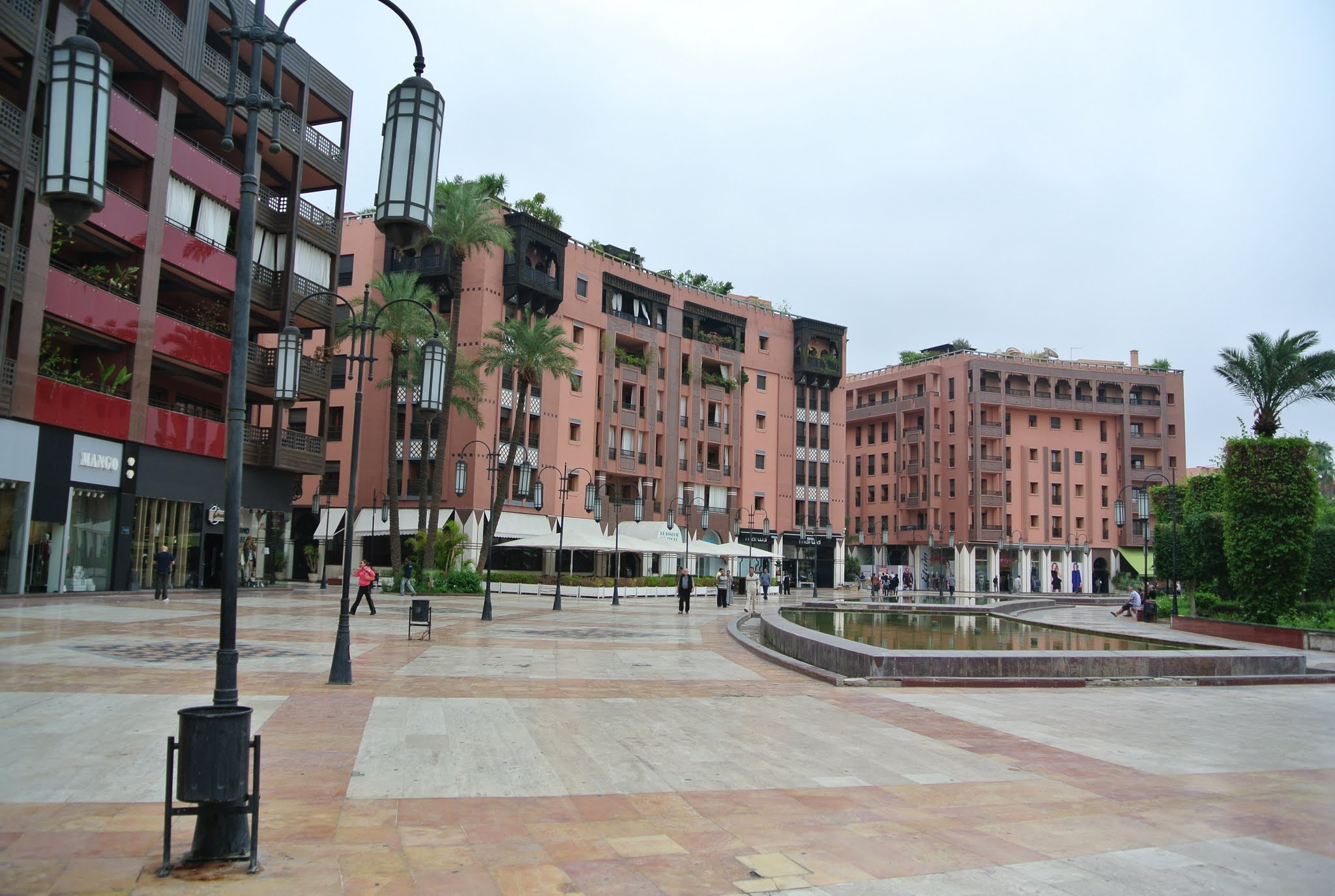
The Gueliz district in Marrakech was established outside the old city during the French Protectorate period (after 1912).

Since the independence of Morocco, Marrakesh has thrived as a tourist destination. In the 1960s and early 1970s, the city became a trendy "hippie mecca". It attracted numerous western rock stars and musicians, artists, film directors and actors, models, and fashion divas, leading tourism revenues to double in Morocco between 1965 and 1970. Yves Saint Laurent, the Beatles, The Rolling Stones and Jean-Paul Getty all spent significant time in the city; Laurent bought a property here and renovated the Majorelle Gardens. Expatriates, especially those from France, have invested heavily in Marrakesh since the 1960s and developed many of the riads and palaces. Over the following decades, the demographic importance of the historic medina declined, due to much of it being converted from residential housing to commercial properties as well as due to the general expansion of the city beyond its traditional areas. In 1984, about 51% of the city's population lived in the medina, whereas only 22% did in 2004.

United Nations agencies became active in Marrakesh beginning in the 1970s, and the city's international political presence has subsequently grown. In 1985, UNESCO declared the old town area of Marrakesh a UNESCO World Heritage Site, raising international awareness of the cultural heritage of the city. In the 1980s, Patrick Guerand-Hermes purchased the 30 acres (12 ha) Ain el Quassimou, built by the family of Leo Tolstoy. On 15 April 1994, the Marrakesh Agreement was signed here to establish the World Trade Organisation, and in March 1997 Marrakesh served as the site of the World Water Council's first World Water Forum, which was attended by over 500 international participants.

=== 21st century ===
In the 21st century, property and real estate development in the city has boomed, with a dramatic increase in new hotels and shopping centres, fuelled by the policies of Mohammed VI of Morocco, who aims to increase the number of tourists annually visiting Morocco to 20 million by 2020. In 2010, a major gas explosion occurred in the city. On 28 April 2011, a bomb attack took place in the Jemaa el-Fnaa square, killing 15 people, mainly foreigners. The blast destroyed the nearby Argana Cafe. Police sources arrested three suspects and claimed the chief suspect was loyal to Al-Qaeda, although Al-Qaeda in the Islamic Maghreb denied involvement. In November 2016 the city hosted the 2016 United Nations Climate Change Conference. In September 2023, the city was affected by a deadly earthquake. A month after the earthquake, the city hosted the Annual Meetings of the International Monetary Fund and the World Bank Group, which was held from 9 to 15 October 2023.

== Geography ==
In winter, the High Atlas mountains are typically covered in snow and ice. and are visible from the city on clear days.

The city is located in the Tensift River valley, with the Tensift River passing along the northern edge of the city. The Ourika River valley is about 30 kilometres (19 mi) south of Marrakesh. The city has expanded north from the old centre with suburbs such as Daoudiat, Diour El Massakine, Sidi Abbad, Sakar and Amerchich, to the southeast with Sidi Youssef Ben Ali, to the west with Massira and Targa, and southwest to M'hamid beyond the airport. On the P2017 road leading south out of the city are large villages such as Douar Lahna, Touggana, Lagouassem, and Lahebichate, leading eventually through desert to the town of Tahnaout at the edge of the High Atlas, the highest mountainous barrier in North Africa. The average elevation of the snow-covered High Atlas lies above 3,000 metres (9,800 ft). It is mainly composed of Jurassic limestone. The mountain range runs along the Atlantic coast, then rises to the east of Agadir and extends northeast into Algeria before disappearing into Tunisia.

The Ourika River valley

=== Climate ===
Marrakesh features a hot semi-arid climate (Köppen climate classification BSh) with long, hot dry summers and brief, mild to cool winters. Average temperatures range from 12 °C (54 °F) in the winter to 26–30 °C (79–86 °F) in the summer. The relatively wet winter and dry summer precipitation pattern of Marrakesh mirrors precipitation patterns found in Mediterranean climates. However, the city receives less rain than is typically found in a Mediterranean climate, which results in a semi-arid climate classification.

Between 1961 and 1990 the city averaged 281.3 millimetres (11.1 in) of precipitation annually. Barrows says of the climate, "The region of Marrakesh is frequently described as desert in character, but, to one familiar with the southwestern parts of the United States, the locality does not suggest the desert, rather an area of seasonal rainfall, where moisture moves underground rather than by surface streams, and where low brush takes the place of the forests of more heavily watered regions. The location of Marrakesh on the north side of the Atlas, rather than the south, prevents it from being described as a desert city, and it remains the northern focus of the Saharan lines of communication, and its history, its types of dwellers, and its commerce and arts, are all related to the great south Atlas spaces that reach further into the Sahara desert."

Climate data for Marrakesh, Morocco (Marrakesh Menara Airport) 1991–2020, extremes 1900–present
Month	Jan	Feb	Mar	Apr	May	Jun	Jul	Aug	Sep	Oct	Nov	Dec	Year
Record high °C (°F)	30.1 (86.2)	34.3 (93.7)	37.0 (98.6)	41.3 (106.3)	44.4 (111.9)	46.9 (116.4)	49.6 (121.3)	48.6 (119.5)	44.8 (112.6)	39.8 (103.6)	35.2 (95.4)	30.9 (87.6)	49.6 (121.3)
Mean maximum °C (°F)	24.3 (75.7)	26.5 (79.7)	30.9 (87.6)	34.1 (93.4)	38.2 (100.8)	41.9 (107.4)	44.8 (112.6)	44.4 (111.9)	40.5 (104.9)	35.2 (95.4)	28.7 (83.7)	24.9 (76.8)	45.8 (114.4)
Mean daily maximum °C (°F)	19.1 (66.4)	20.7 (69.3)	23.6 (74.5)	25.7 (78.3)	29.4 (84.9)	33.6 (92.5)	37.7 (99.9)	37.4 (99.3)	32.5 (90.5)	28.5 (83.3)	23.1 (73.6)	20.1 (68.2)	27.6 (81.7)
Daily mean °C (°F)	12.5 (54.5)	14.2 (57.6)	17.0 (62.6)	19.0 (66.2)	22.3 (72.1)	25.8 (78.4)	29.2 (84.6)	29.3 (84.7)	25.6 (78.1)	22.1 (71.8)	16.9 (62.4)	13.7 (56.7)	20.6 (69.1)
Mean daily minimum °C (°F)	5.9 (42.6)	7.6 (45.7)	10.3 (50.5)	12.4 (54.3)	15.2 (59.4)	17.9 (64.2)	20.6 (69.1)	21.1 (70.0)	18.6 (65.5)	15.7 (60.3)	10.7 (51.3)	7.3 (45.1)	13.6 (56.5)
Mean minimum °C (°F)	2.2 (36.0)	3.8 (38.8)	5.9 (42.6)	8.1 (46.6)	11.2 (52.2)	14.3 (57.7)	17.0 (62.6)	17.4 (63.3)	14.9 (58.8)	11.3 (52.3)	6.5 (43.7)	3.6 (38.5)	1.0 (33.8)
Record low °C (°F)	−3.6 (25.5)	−3.0 (26.6)	0.4 (32.7)	2.8 (37.0)	6.8 (44.2)	9.0 (48.2)	10.4 (50.7)	6.0 (42.8)	10.0 (50.0)	1.1 (34.0)	0.0 (32.0)	−1.6 (29.1)	−3.6 (25.5)
Average precipitation mm (inches)	25.0 (0.98)	25.7 (1.01)	35.2 (1.39)	26.3 (1.04)	10.5 (0.41)	3.1 (0.12)	2.2 (0.09)	4.7 (0.19)	15.2 (0.60)	19.1 (0.75)	29.8 (1.17)	24.2 (0.95)	221.0 (8.70)
Average precipitation days (≥ 1.0 mm)	3.0	3.7	4.7	2.9	1.5	0.6	0.3	0.8	1.3	2.4	3.8	4.1	29.1
Average relative humidity (%)	65	66	61	60	58	55	47	47	52	59	62	65	58
Mean monthly sunshine hours	230.1	216.5	252.8	270.2	303.1	359.7	330.4	315.1	266.8	251.5	228.9	226.6	3,251.7
Percentage possible sunshine	65	66	69	70	73	82	84	83	77	71	67	63	74
Source 1: NOAA (sun 1981–2010)
Source 2: Deutscher Wetterdienst (record highs for February, April, May, September and November, and humidity), Meteo Climat (record highs and record lows for June, July and August only)

Climate data for Marrakesh
Month	Jan	Feb	Mar	Apr	May	Jun	Jul	Aug	Sep	Oct	Nov	Dec	Year
Mean daily daylight hours	10.0	11.0	12.0	13.0	14.0	14.0	14.0	13.0	12.0	11.0	11.0	10.0	12.1
Average Ultraviolet index	3	5	7	8	10	11	11	10	9	6	4	3	7.3
Source: Weather Atlas

==== Climate change ====
A 2019 paper published in PLOS One estimated that under Representative Concentration Pathway 4.5, a "moderate" scenario of climate change where global warming reaches ~2.5–3 °C (4.5–5.4 °F) by 2100, the climate of Marrakesh in 2050 would most closely resemble the current climate of Bir Lehlou in Western Sahara. The annual temperature would increase by 2.9 °C (5.2 °F), and the temperature of the coldest month by 1.6 °C (2.9 °F), while the temperature of the warmest month would increase by 7 °C (13 °F). According to Climate Action Tracker, the current warming trajectory appears consistent with 2.7 °C (4.9 °F), which closely matches RCP 4.5.

=== Water ===
Marrakesh's water supply relies partly on groundwater resources, which have lowered gradually over the last 40 years, attaining an acute decline in the early 2000s. Since 2002, groundwater levels have dropped by an average of 0.9 m per year in 80% of Marrakesh and its surrounding area. The most affected area experienced a drop of 37 m (more than 2 m per year).

== Demographics ==
According to the 2014 census, the population of Marrakesh was 928,850 against 843,575 in 2004. The number of households in 2014 was 217,245 against 173,603 in 2004.

== Economy ==
Traditional riad renovation represents a growing niche in the real estate market, combining heavy initial restoration costs with high potential yields from tourism

M avenue is a fully pedestrian commercial and cultural district

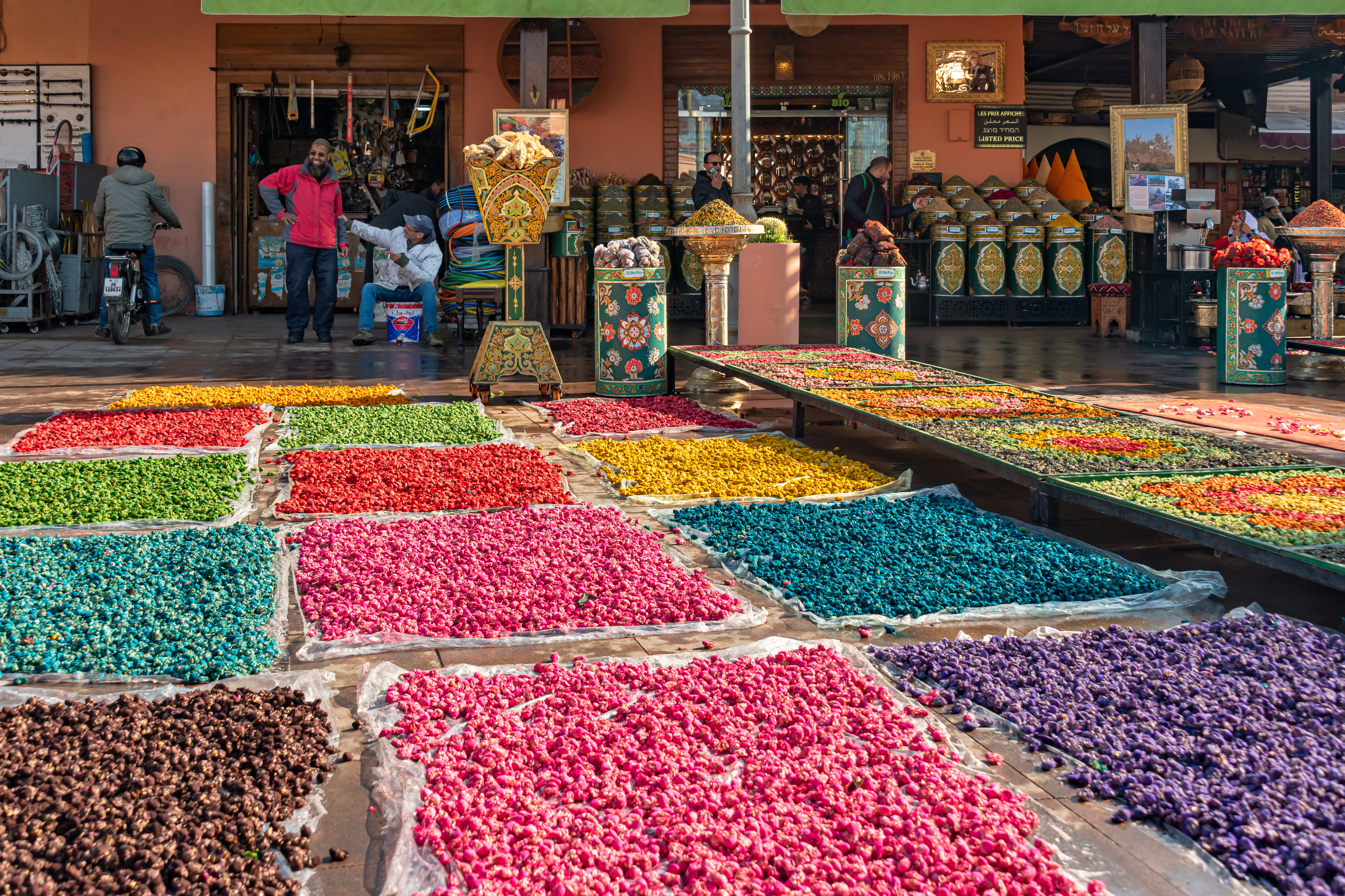
Herbalists at Tinsmiths square

Marrakesh is a vital component of the economy and culture of Morocco. Improvements to the highways from Marrakesh to Casablanca, Agadir and the local airport have led to a dramatic increase in tourism in the city, which now attracts over two million tourists annually. Because of the importance of tourism to Morocco's economy, King Mohammed VI vowed in 2012 to double the number of tourists, attracting 20 million a year to Morocco by 2020. The city is popular with the French, and many French celebrities have bought property in the city, including fashion moguls Yves St Laurent and Jean-Paul Gaultier. In the 1990s very few foreigners lived in the city, and real estate developments have dramatically increased in the last 15 years; by 2005 over 3,000 foreigners had purchased properties in the city, lured by its culture and the relatively cheap house prices. It has been cited in French weekly magazine Le Point as the second St Tropez: "No longer simply a destination for a scattering of adventurous elites, bohemians or backpackers seeking Arabian Nights fantasies, Marrakech is becoming a desirable stopover for the European jet set." However, despite the tourism boom, the majority of the city's inhabitants are still poor, and as of 2010, some 20,000 households still have no access to water or electricity. Many enterprises in the city are facing colossal debt problems.

After the Great Recession and the 2008 financial crisis, in 2011, investments in real estate progressed substantially both in the area of tourist accommodation and social housing. The main developments have been in facilities for tourists including hotels and leisure centres such as golf courses and health spas, with investments of 10.9 billion dirham (US$1.28 billion) in 2011. The hotel infrastructure in recent years has experienced rapid growth. In 2012, alone, 19 new hotels were scheduled to open, a development boom often compared to Dubai. Royal Ranches Marrakech, one of Gulf Finance House's flagship projects in Morocco, is a 380 hectares (940 acres) resort under development in the suburbs and one of the world's first five star Equestrian Resorts. The resort is expected to make a significant contribution to the local and national economy, creating many jobs and attracting thousands of visitors annually; as of April 2012 it was about 45% complete. The Avenue Mohammed VI, formerly Avenue de France, is a major city thoroughfare. It has seen rapid development of residential complexes and many luxury hotels. Avenue Mohammed VI contains what is claimed to be Africa's largest nightclub: Pacha Marrakech, a trendy club that plays house and electro house music. It also has two large cinema complexes, Le Colisée à Gueliz and Cinéma Rif, and a new shopping precinct, Al Mazar.

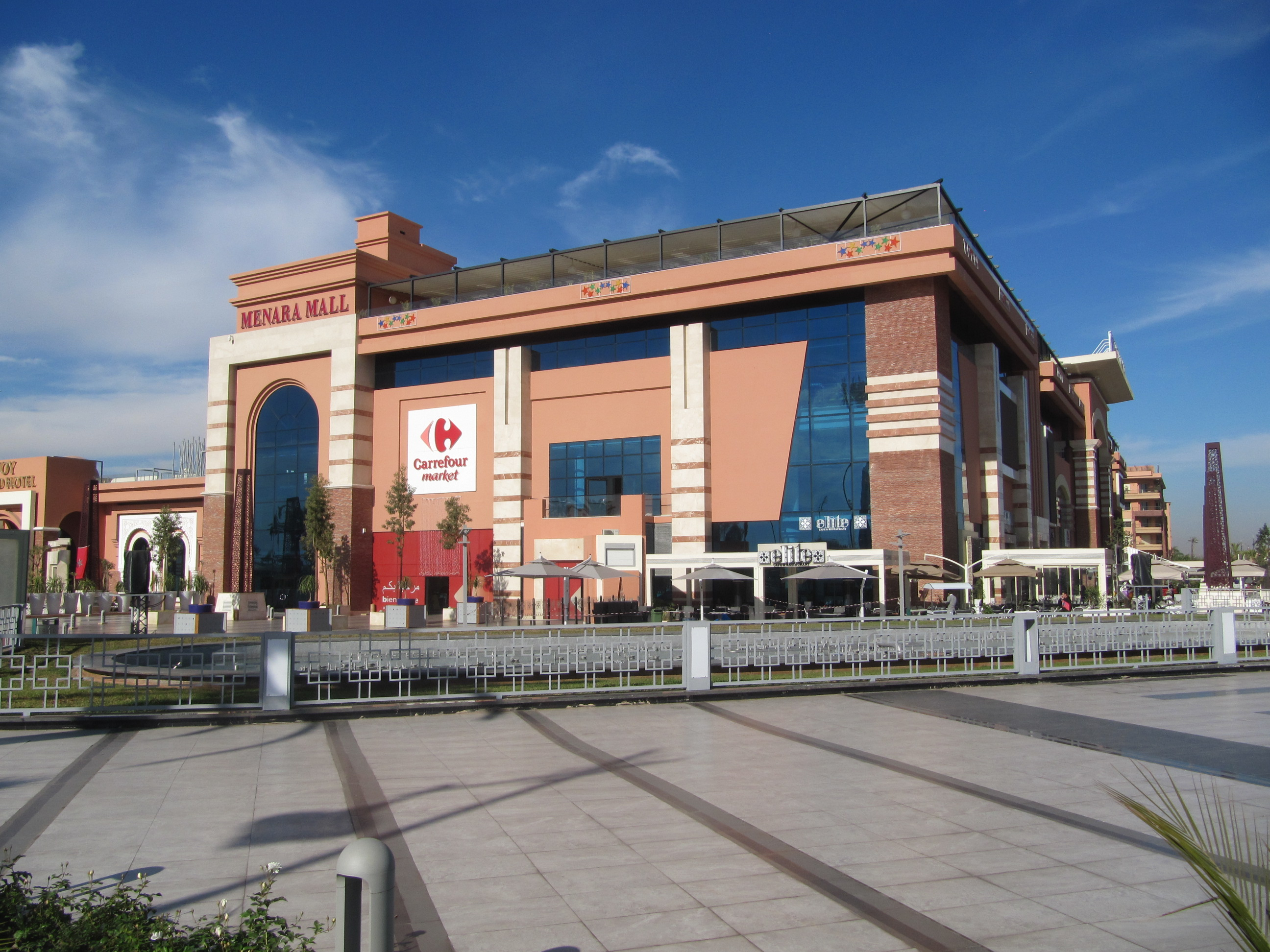
Menara Mall, opened in 2015

Trade and crafts are extremely important to the local tourism-fuelled economy. There are 18 souks in Marrakesh, employing over 40,000 people in pottery, copperware, leather and other crafts. The souks contain a massive range of items from plastic sandals to Palestinian-style scarves imported from India or China. Local boutiques are adept at making western-style clothes using Moroccan materials. The Birmingham Post comments: "The souk offers an incredible shopping experience with a myriad of narrow winding streets that lead through a series of smaller markets clustered by trade. Through the squawking chaos of the poultry market, the gory fascination of the open-air butchers' shops and the uncountable number of small and specialist traders, just wandering around the streets can pass an entire day." Marrakesh has several supermarkets including Marjane Acima, Asswak Salam and Carrefour, and three major shopping centres, Al Mazar Mall, Plaza Marrakech and Marjane Square; a branch of Carrefour opened in Al Mazar Mall in 2010. Industrial production in the city is centred in the neighbourhood of Sidi Ghanem Al Massar, containing large factories, workshops, storage depots and showrooms. Ciments Morocco, a subsidiary of a major Italian cement firm, has a factory in Marrakech.

Marrakesh is one of North Africa's largest centres of wildlife trade, despite the illegality of most of this trade. Much of this trade can be found in the medina and adjacent squares. Tortoises are particularly popular for sale as pets, and Barbary macaques and snakes can also be seen. The majority of these animals suffer from poor welfare conditions in these stalls.

== Tourism ==
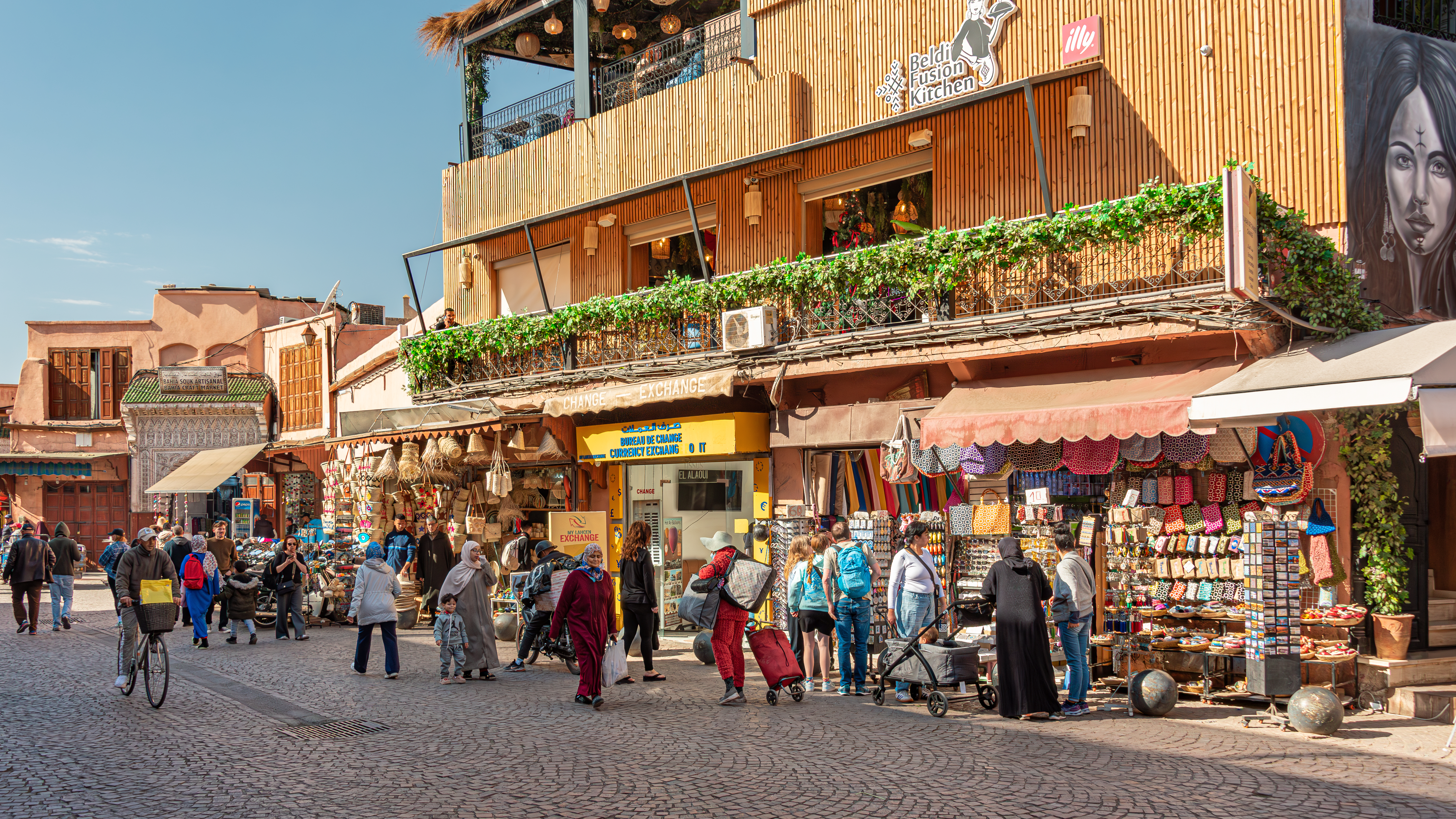
Street life in Marrakech

Marrakesh is a popular tourist destination. Riad tourism in Marrakesh has shaped the urban fabric of the city. The medina of Marrakesh has been cultivated since the French protectorate as a setting for Westerners that corresponds to the Orientalist stereotypes of the Muslim world, and, according to Mauro Spotorno in 2018, "more and more frequently traditional houses of the historical centre have been restored and renovated into hotel facilities, and nowadays, the medina is an interesting study case of the processes of gentrification." For Khalid Madhi, the case of tourism in Marrakesh raises questions of heritage commodification, power relations between locals and tourists, the long-term sustainability of tourism-driven urban policy, and the appropriation of land, culture, and memory. According to Nancy Nabeel Aly Demerdash, "Marrakesh is framed and famed to promise hedonistic pleasures" and "such perpetuated representational tropes actually materialize the oriental fantasy for the consumer; consequently, Marrakesh has become more of a product than place."

== Politics ==
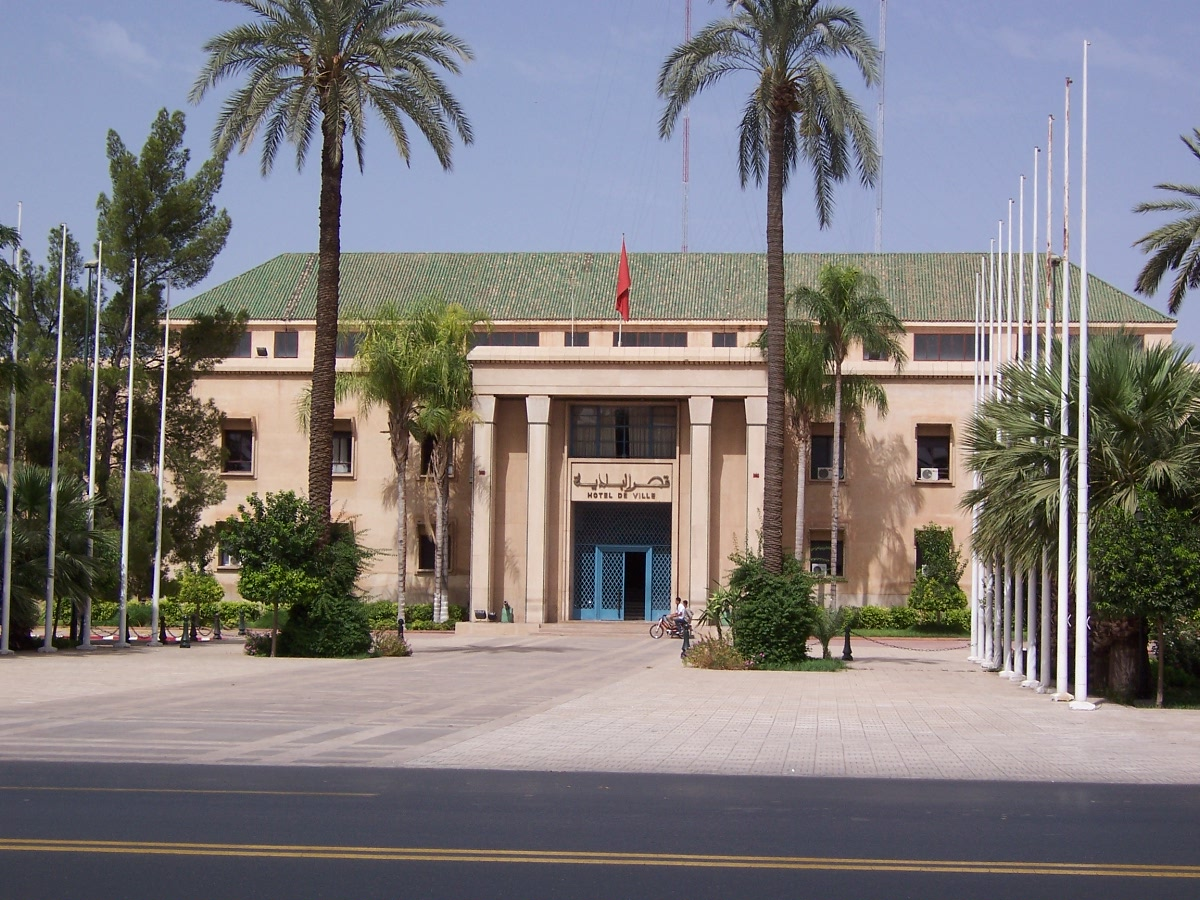
Marrakesh City Hall

Marrakesh, the regional capital, constitutes a prefecture-level administrative unit of Morocco, Marrakech Prefecture, forming part of the region of Marrakech-Safi. Marrakesh is a major centre for law and jurisdiction in Morocco and most of the major courts of the region are here. These include the regional Court of Appeal, the Commercial Court, the Administrative Court, the Court of First Instance, the Court of Appeal of Commerce, and the Administrative Court of Appeal. Numerous organizations of the region are based here, including the regional government administrative offices, the Regional Council of Tourism office, and regional public maintenance organisations such as the Governed Autonomous Water Supply and Electricity and Maroc Telecom.

On 12 June 2009, Fatima-Zahra Mansouri, a then 33-year-old lawyer and daughter of a former assistant to the local authority chief in Marrakesh, was elected the first female mayor of the city, defeating outgoing Mayor Omar Jazouli by 54 votes to 35 in a municipal council vote. Mansouri became the second woman in the history of Morocco to obtain a mayoral position, after Asma Chaabi, mayor of Essaouira and was elected to serve as Marrakech's mayor for a second term in September 2021.

Since the legislative elections in November 2011, the ruling political party in Marrakesh has, for the first time, been the Justice and Development Party or PDJ which also rules at the national level. The party, which advocates Islamism and Islamic democracy, won five seats; the National Rally of Independents (RNI) took one seat, while the PAM won three. In the partial legislative elections for the Guéliz Ennakhil constituency in October 2012, the PDJ under the leadership of Ahmed El Moutassadik was again declared the winner with 10,452 votes. The PAM, largely consisting of friends of King Mohammed VI, came in second place with 9,794 votes.

== Landmarks ==
=== Jemaa el-Fnaa ===
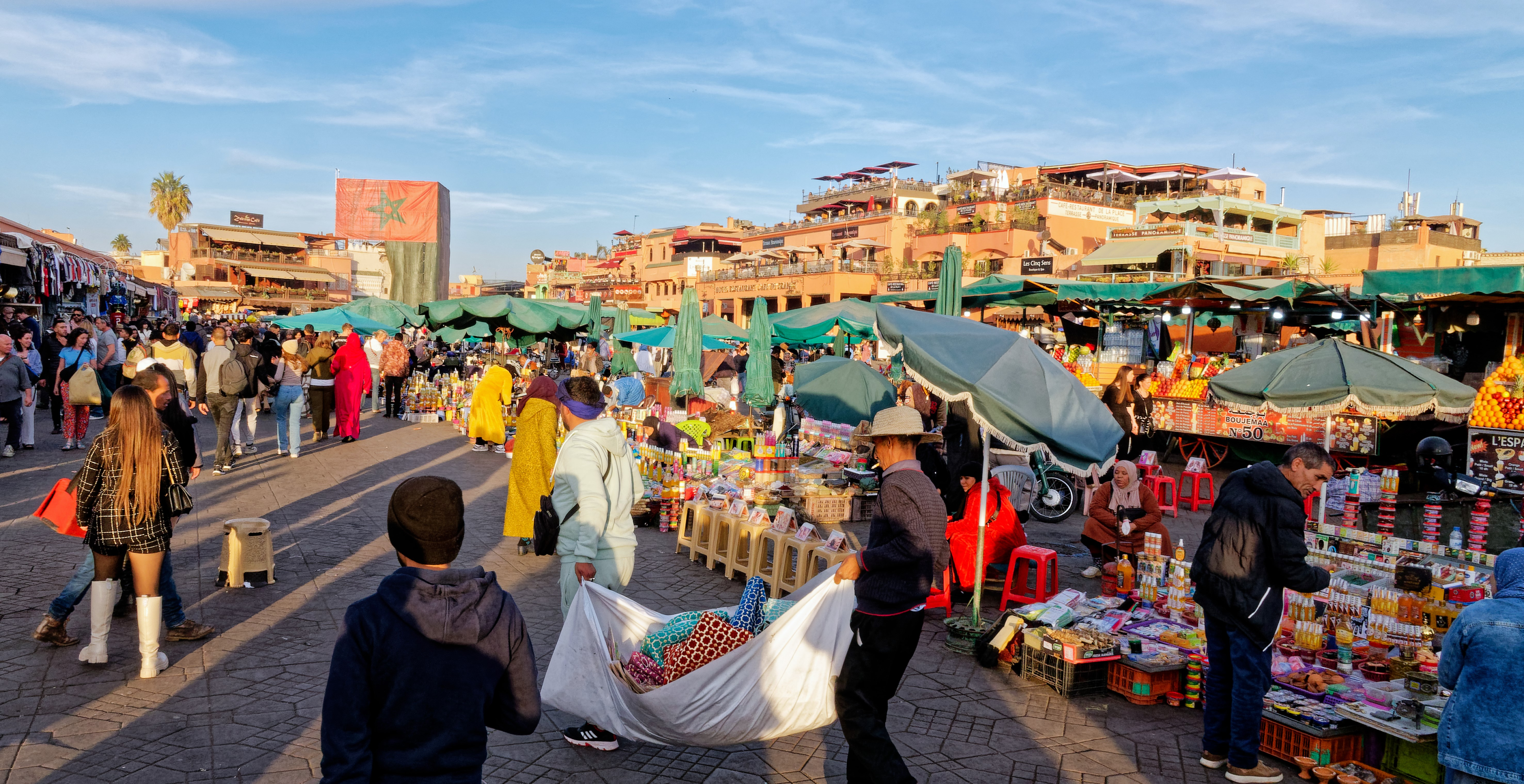
Jemaa el-Fnaa square

The Jemaa el-Fnaa is one of the best-known squares in Africa and is the centre of city activity and trade. It has been described as a "world-famous square", "a metaphorical urban icon, a bridge between the past and the present, the place where (spectacularized) Moroccan tradition encounters modernity." It has been part of the UNESCO World Heritage site since 1985. The square's name has several possible meanings; the most plausible etymology endorsed by historians is that it meant "ruined mosque" or "mosque of annihilation", referring to the construction of a mosque within the square in the late 16th century that was left unfinished and fell into ruin. The square was originally an open space for markets located on the east side of the Ksar el-Hajjar, the main fortress and palace of the Almoravid dynasty who founded Marrakesh.

Historically this square was used for public executions by rulers who sought to maintain their power by frightening the public. The square attracted dwellers from the surrounding desert and mountains to trade here, and stalls were raised in the square from early in its history. It drew tradesmen, snake charmers, dancing boys, and musicians playing pipes, tambourines and African drums. Today the square attracts people from diverse backgrounds and tourists from all around the world. Snake charmers, acrobats, magicians, mystics, musicians, monkey trainers, herb sellers, story-tellers, dentists, pickpockets, and entertainers in medieval garb still populate the square.

=== Souks ===
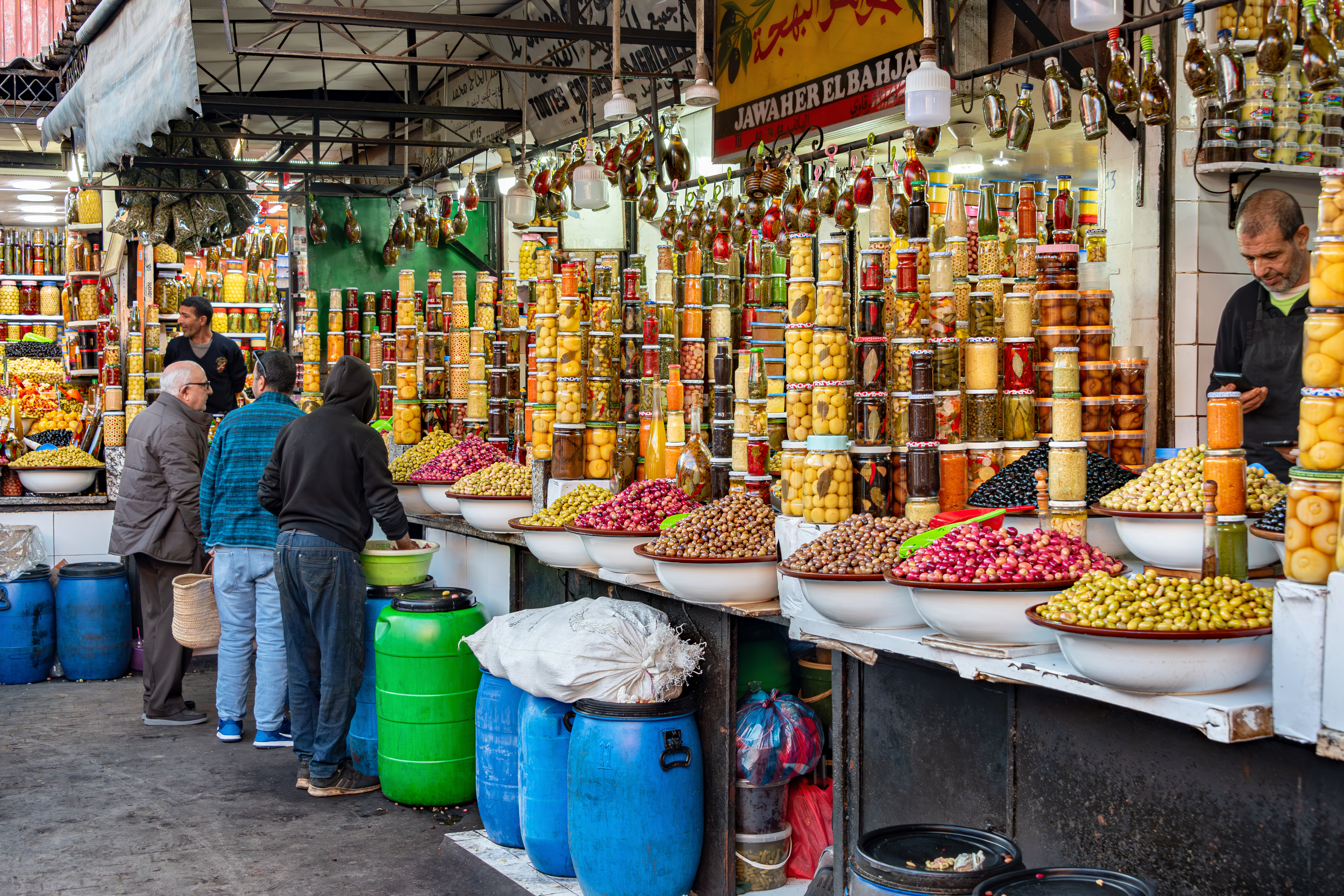
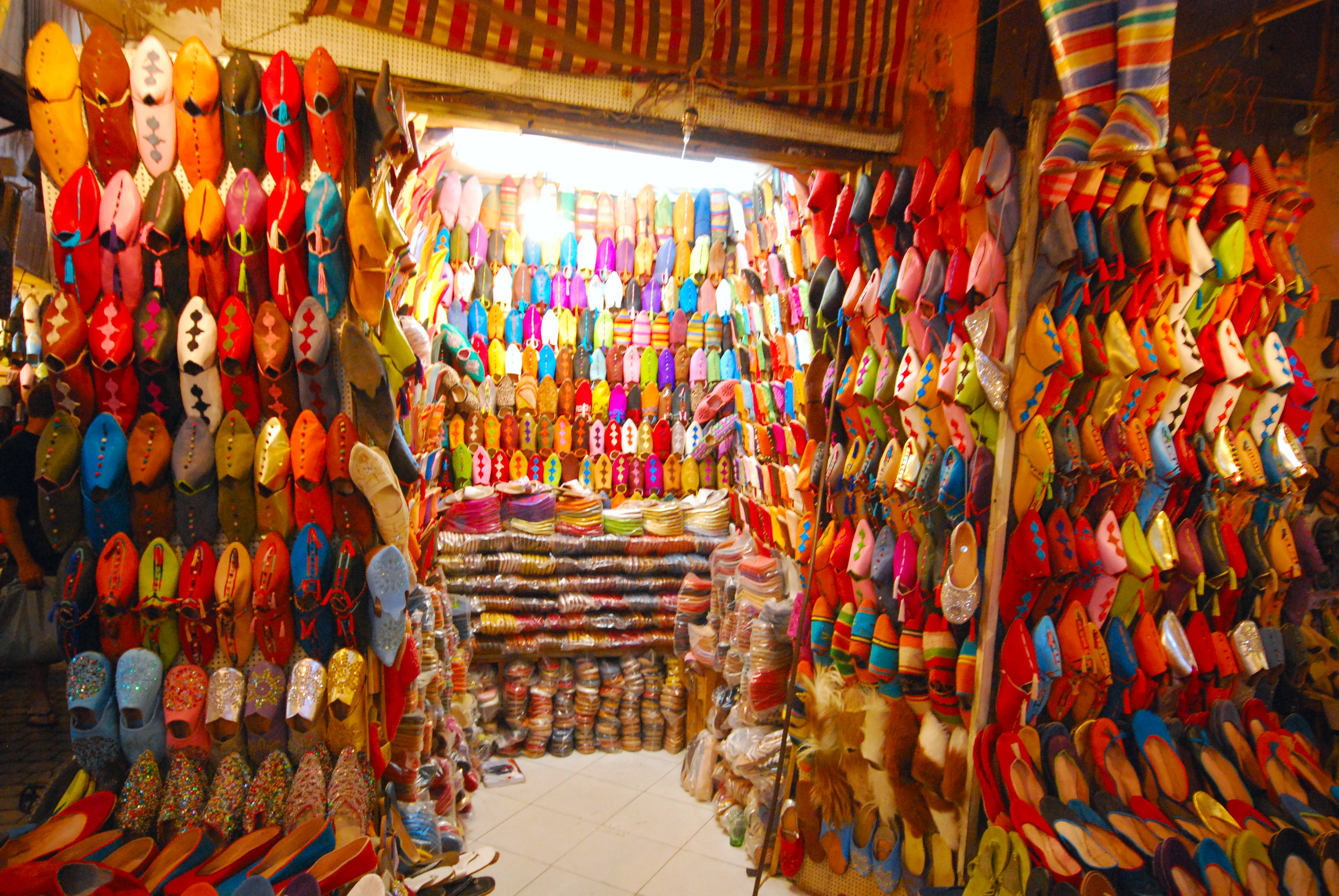
Olives and colourful bejewelled slippers for sale

Marrakesh has the largest traditional market in Morocco and the image of the city is closely associated with its souks. Historically, the souks of Marrakesh were divided into retail areas for particular goods such as leather, carpets, metalwork and pottery. These divisions still roughly exist, though with significant overlap. Many of the souks sell items like carpets and rugs, traditional Muslim attire, leather bags, and lanterns. Haggling is still a very important part of trade in the souks.

The Medina is also famous for its street food. Mechoui Alley is particularly famous for selling slow-roasted lamb dishes. The Ensemble Artisanal, located near the Koutoubia Mosque, is a government-run complex of small arts and crafts which offers a range of leather goods, textiles and carpets. Young apprentices are taught a range of crafts in the workshop at the back of this complex.

=== City walls and gates ===
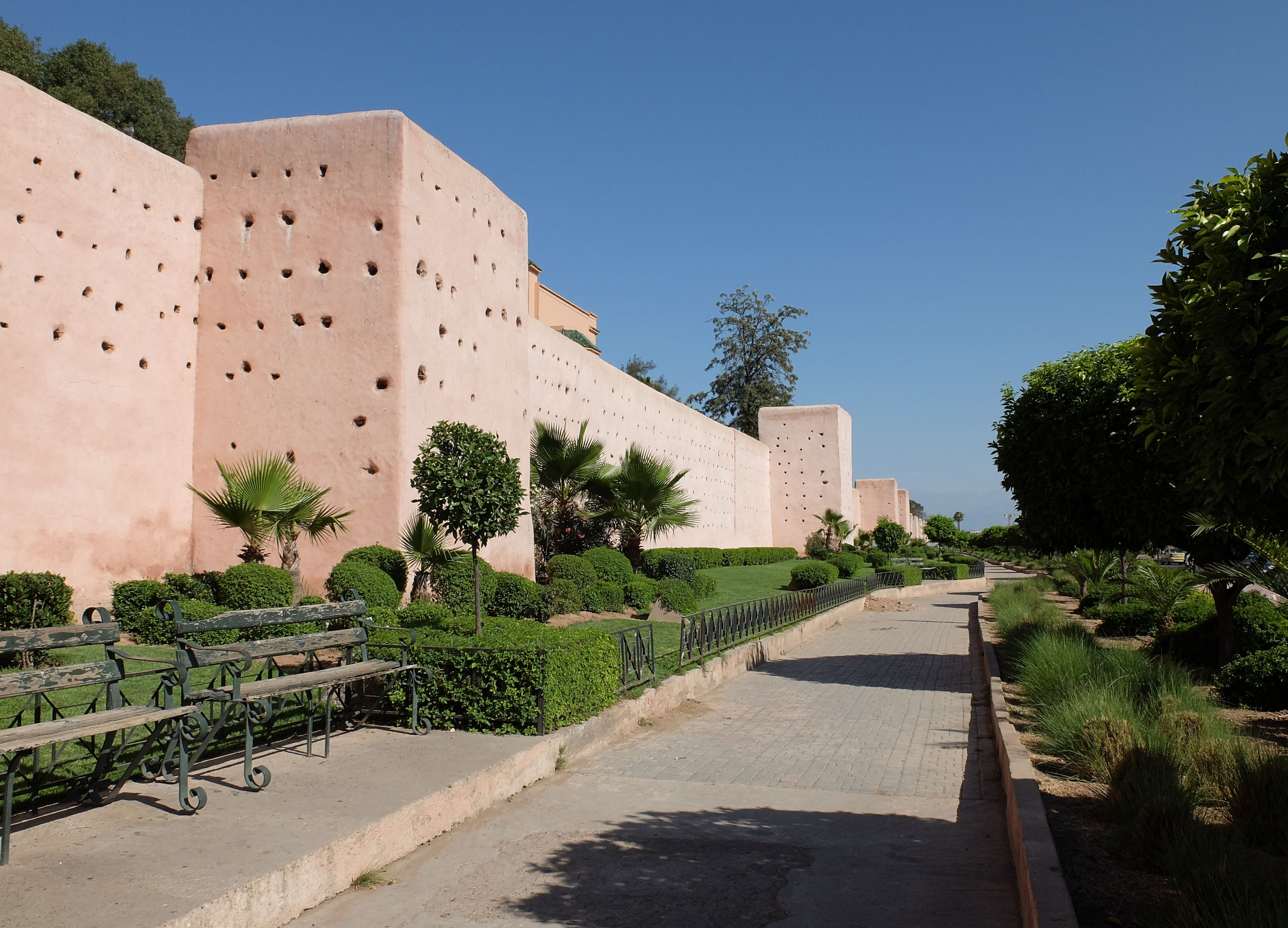
Walls of the historic medina of Marrakesh

The ramparts of Marrakesh, which stretch for some 19 kilometres (12 mi) around the medina of the city, were built by the Almoravids in the 12th century as protective fortifications. The walls are made of a distinct orange-red clay and chalk, giving the city its nickname as the "red city"; they stand up to 19 feet (5.8 m) high and have 20 gates and 200 towers along them.

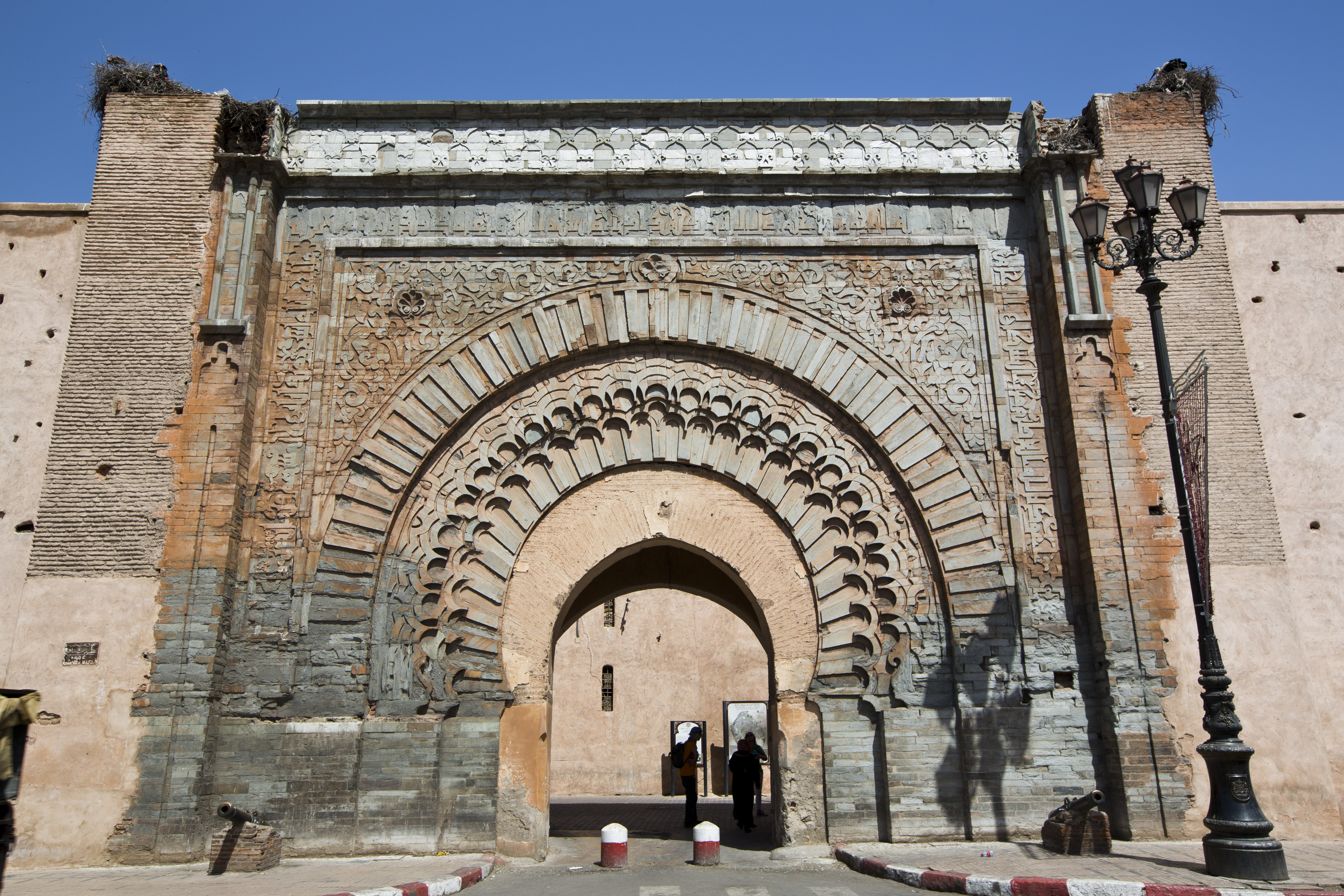
Bab Agnaou, the historic gate of the Kasbah

Of the city's gates, one of the best-known is Bab Agnaou, built in the late 12th century by the Almohad caliph Ya'qub al-Mansur as the main public entrance to the new Kasbah. The gate's carved floral ornamentation is framed by three panels marked with an inscription from the Quran in Maghrebi script using foliated Kufic letters. The medina has at least eight main historic gates: Bab Doukkala, Bab el-Khemis, Bab ad-Debbagh, Bab Aylan, Bab Aghmat, Bab er-Robb, Bab el-Makhzen and Bab el-'Arissa. These date back to the 12th century during the Almoravid period and many of them have been modified since.

=== Gardens ===
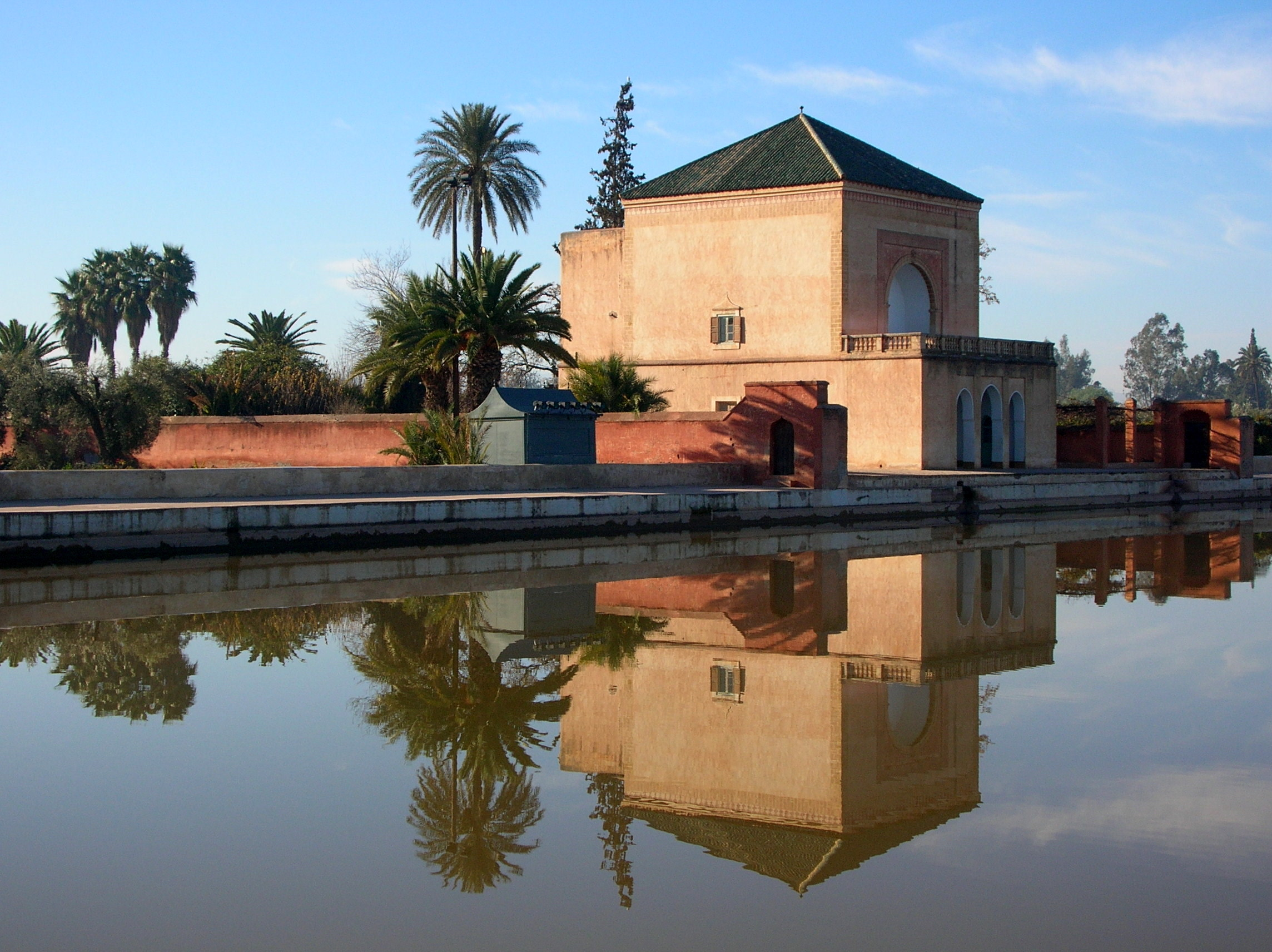
Pavilion and reservoir of the Menara gardens

The city is home to a number of gardens, both historical and modern. The largest and oldest gardens in the city are the Menara Gardens to the west and the Agdal Gardens to the south. The Menara Gardens were established in 1157 by the Almohad ruler Abd al-Mu'min. They are centered around a large water reservoir surrounded by orchards and olive groves. A 19th-century pavilion stands at the edge of the reservoir. The Agdal Gardens were established during the reign of Abu Ya'qub Yusuf (r. 1163–1184) and extend over a larger area today, containing several water basins and palace structures. The Agdal Gardens cover about 340 hectares (1.3 sq mi) and are surrounded by a circuit of pisé walls, while the Menara Gardens cover around 96 hectares (0.37 sq mi). The water reservoirs for both gardens were supplied with water through an old hydraulic system known as khettaras, which conveyed water from the foothills of the nearby Atlas Mountains.

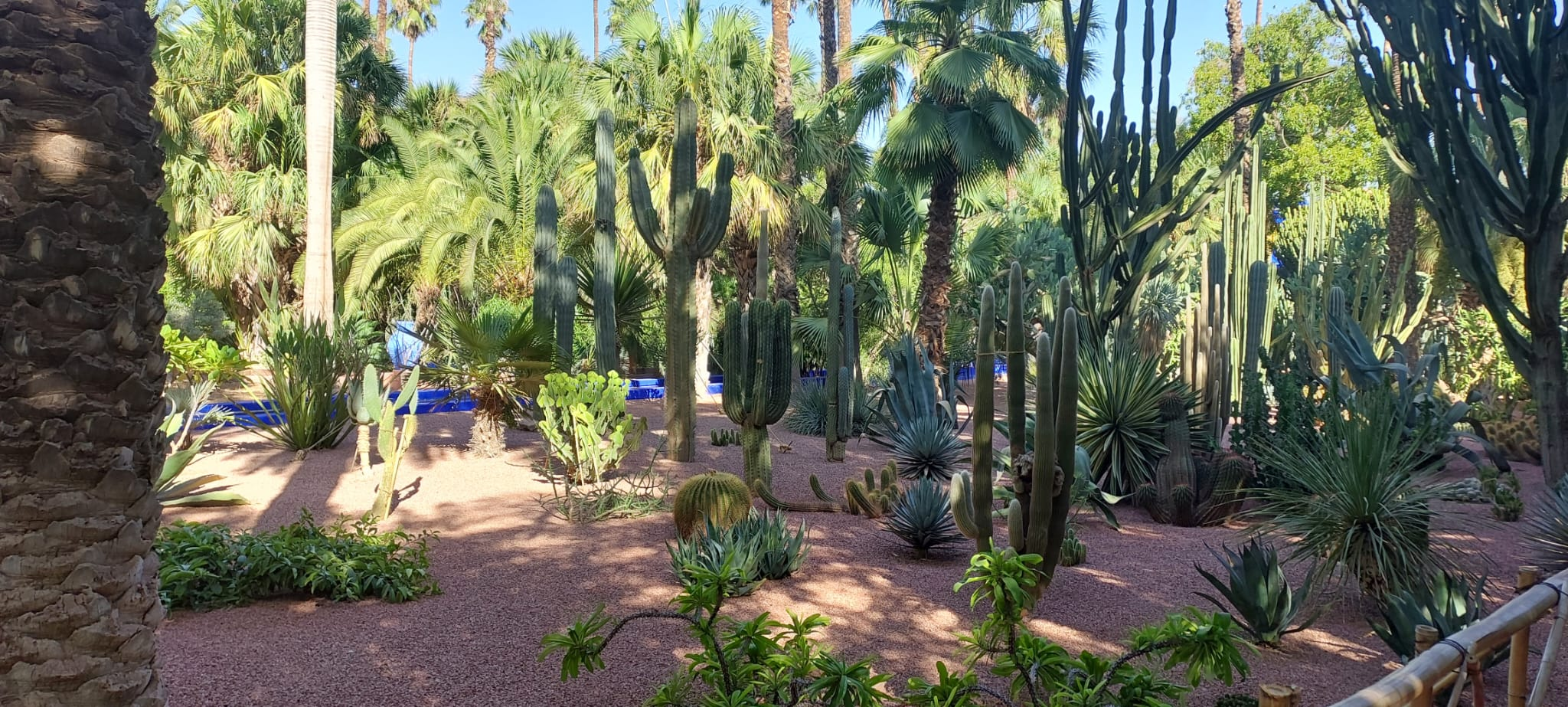
Cacti from Majorelle Garden

The Majorelle Garden, on Avenue Yacoub el Mansour, was at one time the home of the landscape painter Jacques Majorelle. Famed designer Yves Saint Laurent bought and restored the property, which features a stele erected in his memory, and the Museum of Islamic Art, which is housed in a dark blue building. The garden, open to the public since 1947, has a large collection of plants from five continents including cacti, palms and bamboo.

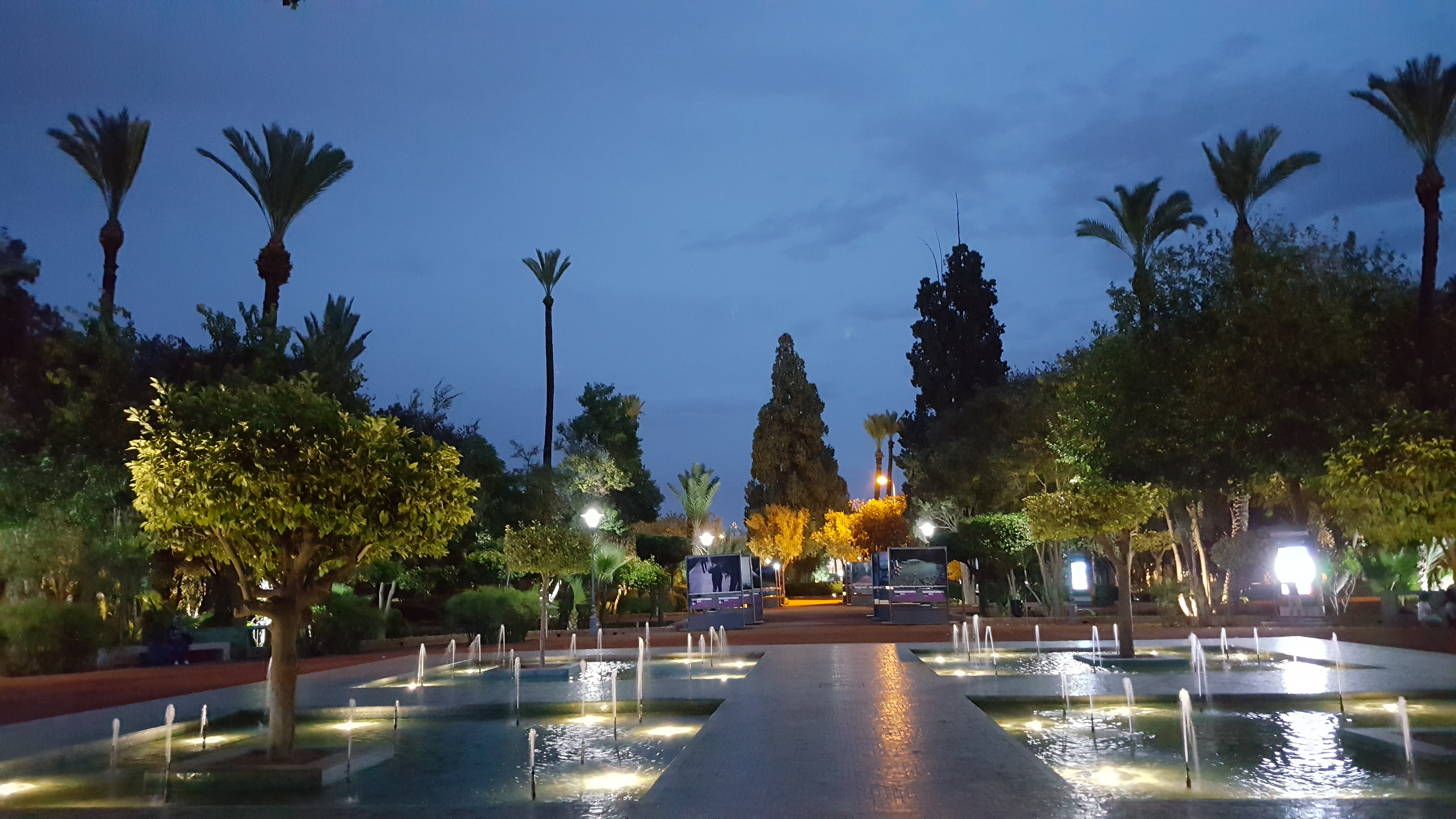
Dating back to the 18th century, Arsat Moulay Abdessalam Garden was renovated and expanded in 2005

The Koutoubia Mosque is also flanked by another set of gardens, the Koutoubia Gardens. They feature orange and palm trees, and are frequented by storks. The Mamounia Gardens, more than 100 years old and named after Prince Moulay Mamoun, have olive and orange trees as well as a variety of floral displays. In 2016, at a location between the city and the Atlas Mountains, artist André Heller opened the ANIMA garden, which combines a diverse collection of plants with a display of works by famous artists such as Keith Haring and Pablo Picasso. In the same year, a large restored riad garden set within a historical mansion, located inside the medina, was opened to visitors as Le Jardin Secret ('The Secret Garden').

Jnan El Harti, dating back to the 1930s is a ~6 hectare park in the Guéliz / Hivernage area.

=== Palaces and Riads ===
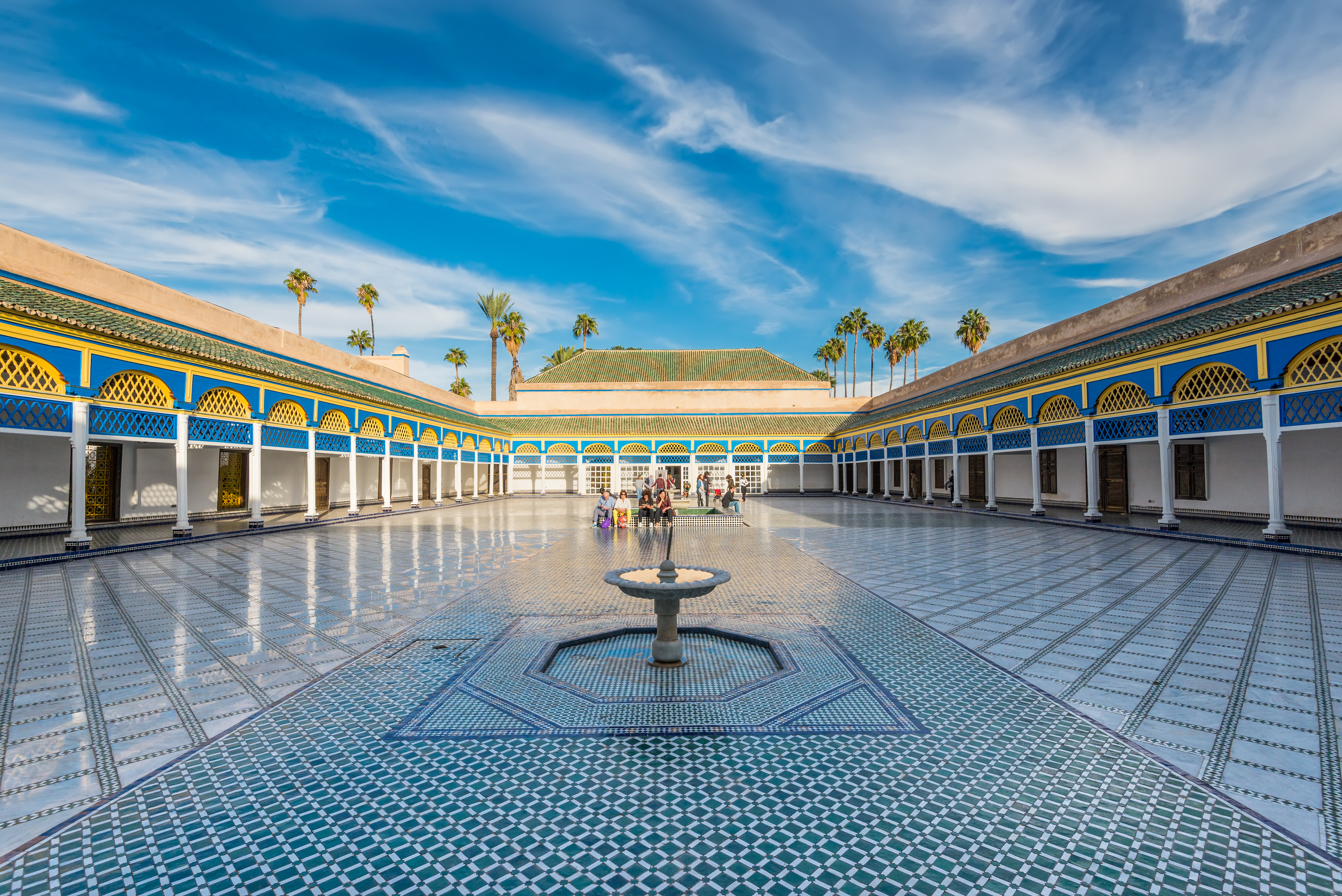
Courtyard of the Bahia Palace

The historic wealth of the city is manifested in palaces, mansions and other lavish residences. The best-known palaces today are the El Badi Palace and the Bahia Palace, as well as the main Royal Palace which is still in use as one of the official residences of the King of Morocco. Riads (Moroccan mansions, historically designating a type of garden) are common in Marrakesh. Based on the design of the Roman villa, they are characterized by an open central garden courtyard surrounded by high walls. This construction provided the occupants with privacy and lowered the temperature within the building. Numerous riads and historic residences exist through the old city, with the oldest documented examples dating back to the Saadian period (16th-17th centuries), while many others date from the 19th and 20th centuries.

=== Mosques ===
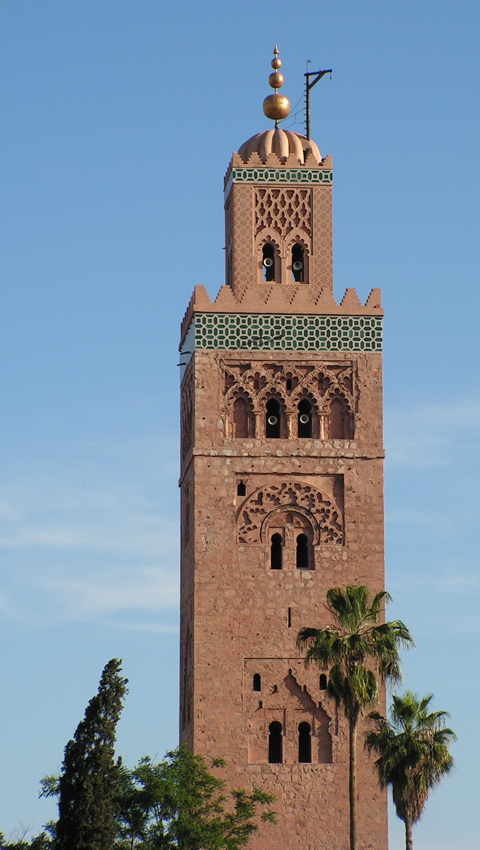
Minaret of the Koutoubia Mosque

The Koutoubia Mosque is one of the largest and most famous mosques in the city, located southwest of Jemaa el-Fnaa. The mosque was founded in 1147 by the Almohad caliph Abd al-Mu'min. A second version of the mosque was entirely rebuilt by Abd al-Mu'min around 1158, with Ya'qub al-Mansur possibly finalizing construction of the minaret around 1195. This second mosque is the structure that stands today. It is considered a major example of Almohad architecture and of Moroccan mosque architecture generally. Its minaret tower, the tallest in the city at 77 metres (253 ft) in height, is considered an important landmark and symbol of Marrakesh. It likely influenced other buildings such as the Giralda of Seville and the Hassan Tower of Rabat.

Ben Youssef Mosque is named after the Almoravid sultan Ali ibn Yusuf, who built the original mosque in the 12th century to serve as the city's main Friday mosque. After being abandoned during the Almohad period and falling into ruin, it was rebuilt in the 1560s by Abdallah al-Ghalib and then completely rebuilt again Moulay Sliman at the beginning of the 19th century. The 16th-century Ben Youssef Madrasa is located next to it. Also next to it is the Almoravid Qubba, a rare architectural remnant of the Almoravid period which was excavated and restored in the 20th century. It is a domed kiosk that demonstrates a sophisticated style and is an important indication of the art and architecture of the period.

The Kasbah Mosque overlooks Place Moulay Yazid in the Kasbah district of Marrakesh, close to the El Badi Palace. It was built by the Almohad caliph Yaqub al-Mansour in the late 12th century to serve as the main mosque of the kasbah (citadel) where he and his high officials resided. It contended with the Koutoubia Mosque for prestige and the decoration of its minaret was highly influential in subsequent Moroccan architecture. The mosque was repaired by the Saadi sultan Moulay Abdallah al-Ghalib following a devastating explosion at a nearby gunpowder reserve in the second half of the 16th century. Notably, the Saadian Tombs were built just outside its southern wall in this period.

Among the other notable mosques of the city is the 14th-century Ben Salah Mosque, located east of the medina centre. It is one of the only major Marinid-era monuments in the city. The Mouassine Mosque (also known as the Al Ashraf Mosque) was built by the Saadian sultan Abdallah al-Ghalib between 1562–63 and 1572–73. It was part of a larger architectural complex which included a library, hammam (public bathhouse), and a madrasa (school). The complex also included a large ornate street fountain known as the Mouassine Fountain, which still exists today. The Bab Doukkala Mosque, built around the same time further west, has a similar layout and style as the Mouassine Mosque. Both the Mouassine and Bab Doukkala mosques appear to have been originally designed to anchor the development of new neighbourhoods after the relocation of the Jewish district from this area to the new mellah near the Kasbah.

=== Tombs ===
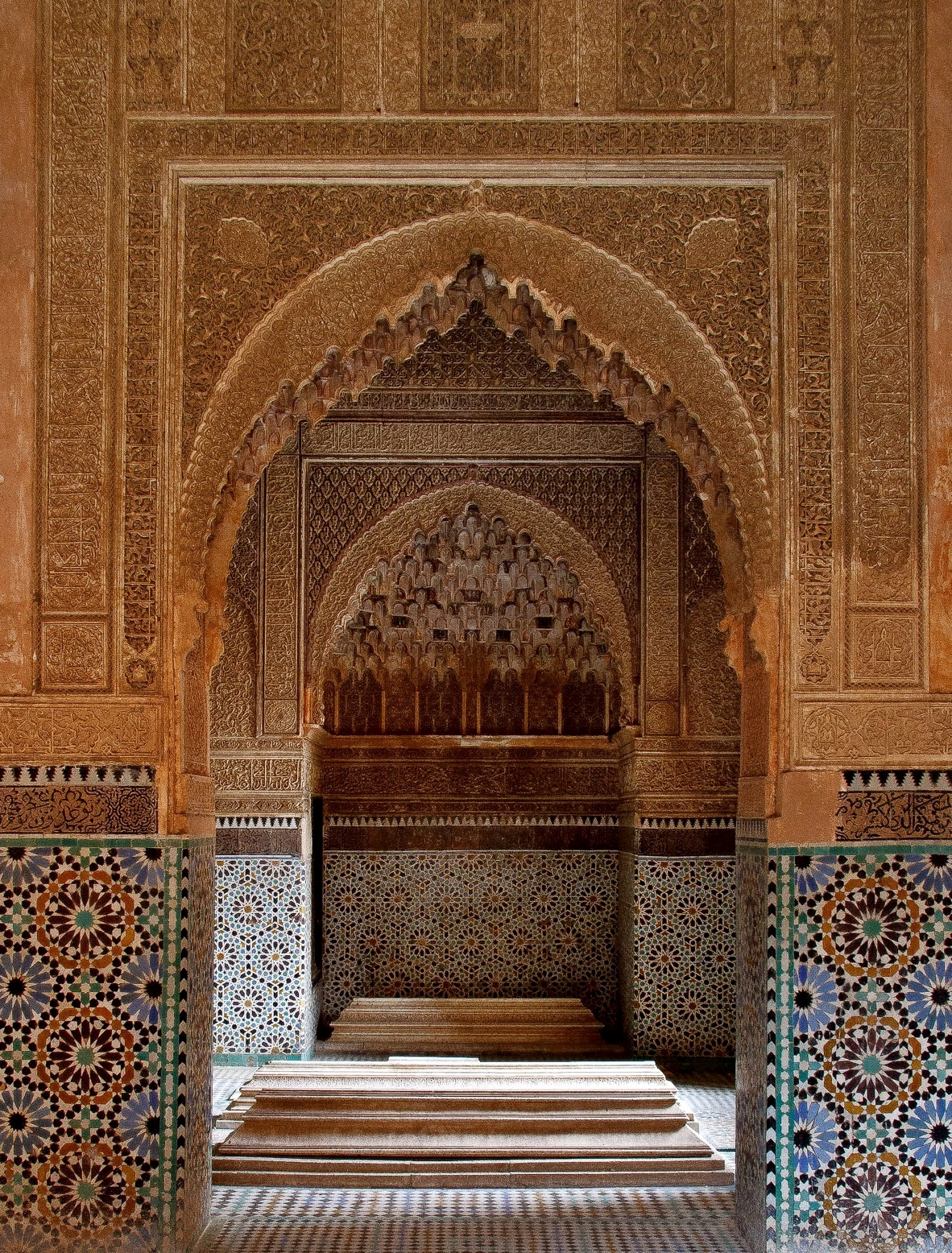
Saadian Tombs

One of the most famous funerary monuments in the city is the Saadian Tombs, which were built in the 16th century as a royal necropolis for the Saadian Dynasty. It is located next to the south wall of the Kasbah Mosque. The necropolis contains the tombs of many Saadian rulers including Muhammad al-Shaykh, Abdallah al-Ghalib, and Ahmad al-Mansur, as well as various family members and later sultans. It consists of two main structures, each with several rooms, standing within a garden enclosure. The most important graves are marked by horizontal tombstones of finely carved marble, while others are merely covered in colorful zellij tiles. Al-Mansur's mausoleum chamber is especially rich in decoration, with a roof of carved and painted cedar wood supported on twelve columns of carrara marble, and with walls decorated with geometric patterns in zellij tilework and vegetal motifs in carved stucco. The chamber next to it, originally a prayer room equipped with a mihrab, was later repurposed as a mausoleum for members of the Alawi dynasty.

The city also holds the tombs of many Sufi figures. Of these, there are seven patron saints of the city, which are visited every year by pilgrims during the seven-day ziyara pilgrimage. During this time, pilgrims visit the tombs in the following order: Sidi Yusuf ibn Ali Sanhaji, Sidi al-Qadi Iyyad al-Yahsubi, Sidi Bel Abbas, Sidi Mohamed ibn Sulayman al-Jazouli, Sidi Abdellaziz Tabba'a, Sidi Abdellah al-Ghazwani, and lastly, Sidi Abderrahman al-Suhayli. Many of these mausoleums also serve as the focus of their own zawiyas (Sufi religious complexes with mosques), including: the Zawiya and mosque of Sidi Bel Abbes (the most important of them), the Zawiya of al-Jazuli, the Zawiya of Sidi Abdellaziz, the Zawiya of Sidi Yusuf ibn Ali, and the Zawiya of Sidi al-Ghazwani (also known as Moulay el-Ksour).

=== Mellah ===
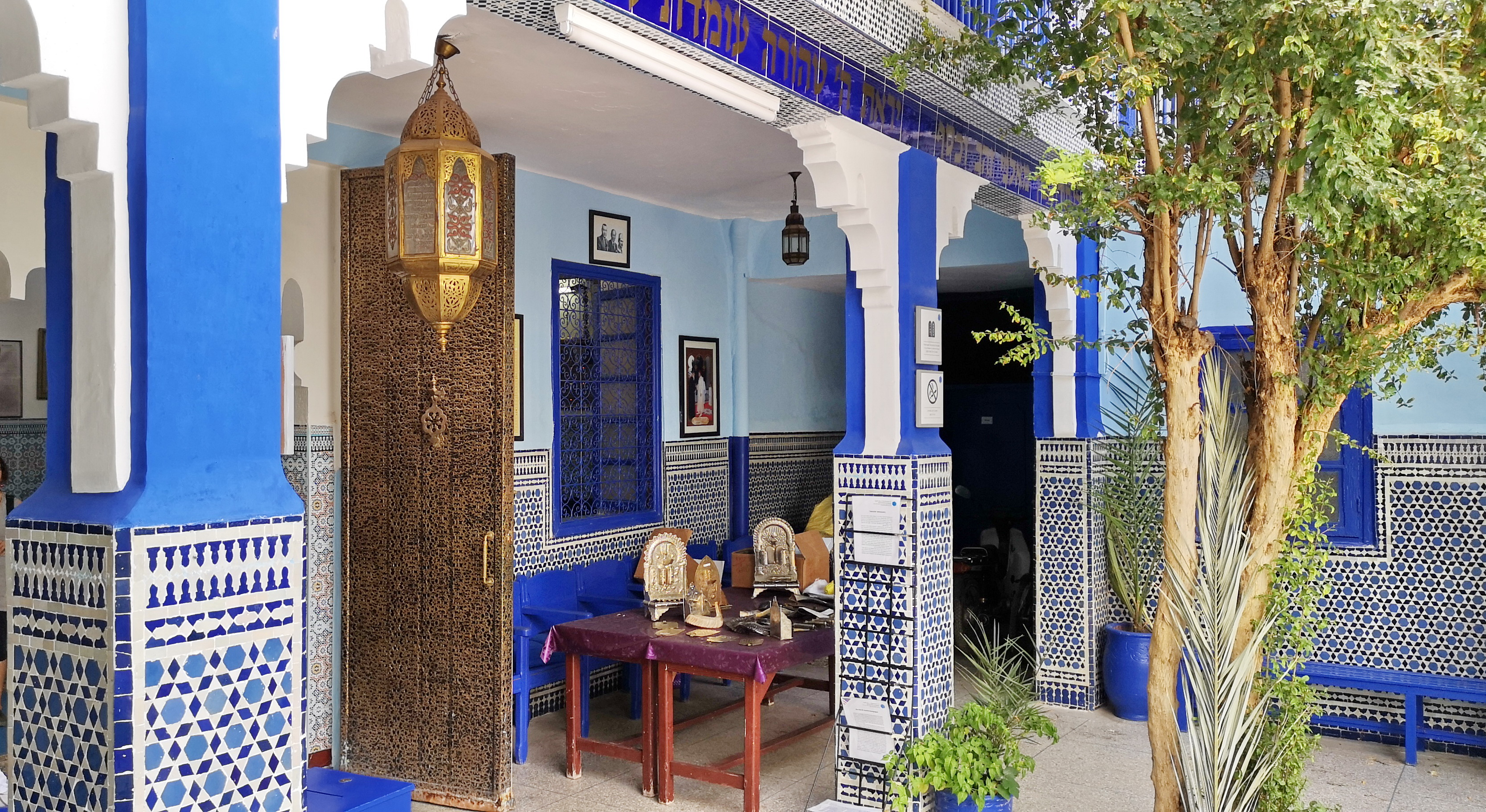
Interior of the Slat al-Azama Synagogue

The Mellah of Marrakesh is the old Jewish Quarter (Mellah) of the city, and is located in the kasbah area of the city's medina, east of Place des Ferblantiers. It was created in 1558 by the Saadians at the site where the sultan's stables were. At the time, the Jewish community consisted of a large portion of the city's tailors, metalworkers, bankers, jewelers, and sugar traders. During the 16th century, the Mellah had its own fountains, gardens, synagogues and souks. Until the arrival of the French in 1912, Jews could not own property outside of the Mellah; all growth was consequently contained within the limits of the neighbourhood, resulting in narrow streets, small shops and higher residential buildings. The Mellah, today reconfigured as a mainly residential zone renamed Hay Essalam, currently occupies an area smaller than its historic limits and has an almost entirely Muslim population. The Slat al-Azama Synagogue (or Lazama Synagogue), built around a central courtyard, is in the Mellah. The Jewish cemetery here is the largest of its kind in Morocco. Characterised by white-washed tombs and sandy graves, the cemetery is within the Medina on land adjacent to the Mellah. According to the World Jewish Congress there were only 250 Moroccan Jews remaining in Marrakesh.

=== Hotels ===
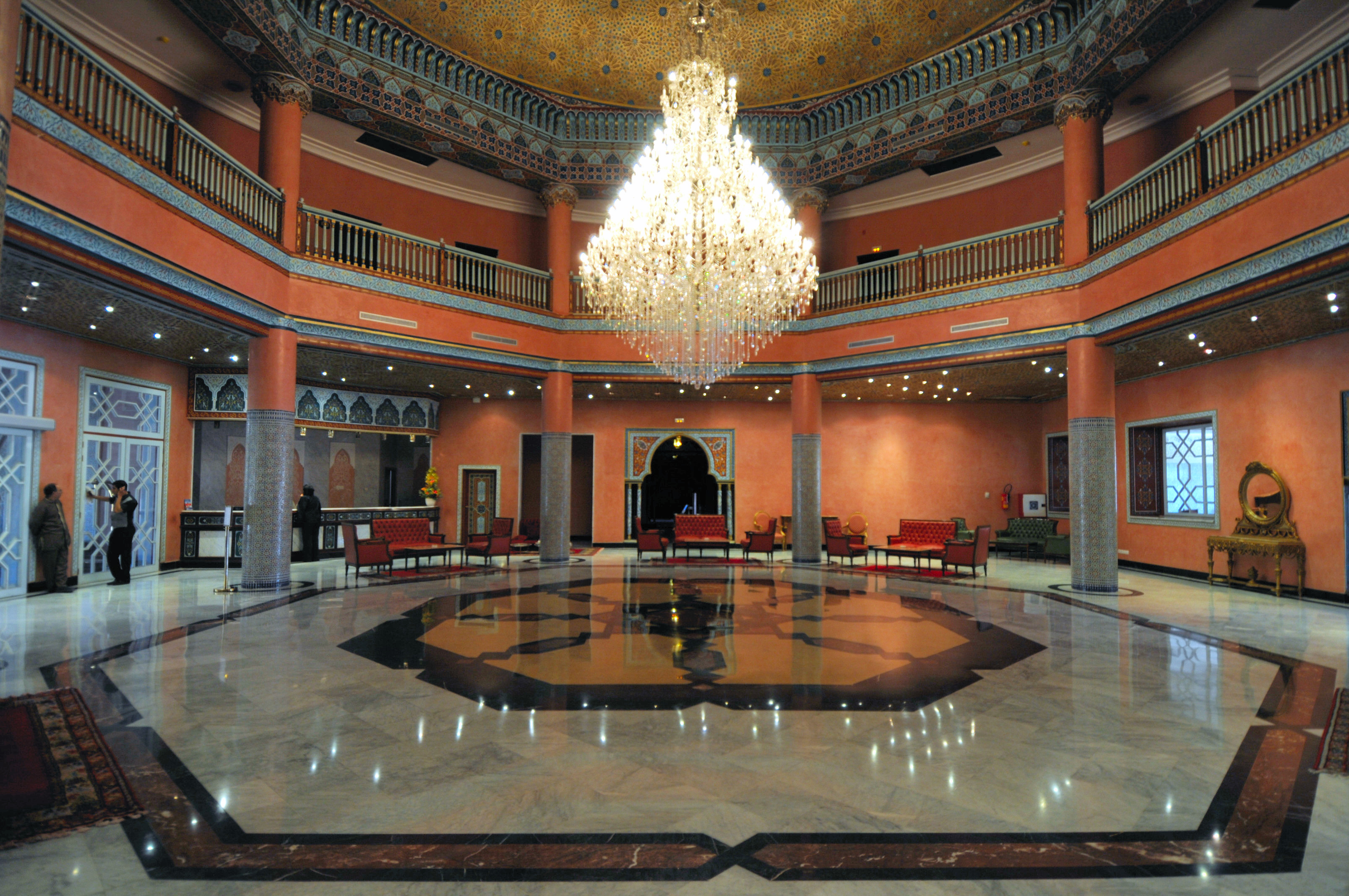
Hotel Marrakech

As one of the principal tourist cities in Africa, Marrakesh has over 400 hotels. Mamounia Hotel is a five-star hotel in the Art Deco-Moroccan fusion style, built in 1925 by Henri Prost and A. Marchis. It is considered the most eminent hotel of the city and has been described as the "grand dame of Marrakesh hotels." The hotel has hosted numerous internationally renowned people including Winston Churchill, Prince Charles and Mick Jagger. Churchill used to relax within the gardens of the hotel and paint there. The 231-room hotel, which contains a casino, was refurbished in 1986 and again in 2007 by French designer Jacques Garcia. Other hotels include Eden Andalou Hotel, Hotel Marrakech, Sofitel Marrakech, Palm Plaza Hotel & Spa, Royal Mirage Hotel, Piscina del Hotel, and Palmeraie Palace at the Palmeraie Rotana Resort. In March 2012, Accor opened its first Pullman-branded hotel in Marrakech, Pullman Marrakech Palmeraie Resort & Spa. Set in a 17 hectares (42 acres) olive grove at La Palmeraie, the hotel has 252 rooms, 16 suites, six restaurants and a 535 square metres (5,760 sq ft) conference room.

== Culture ==
=== Museums ===
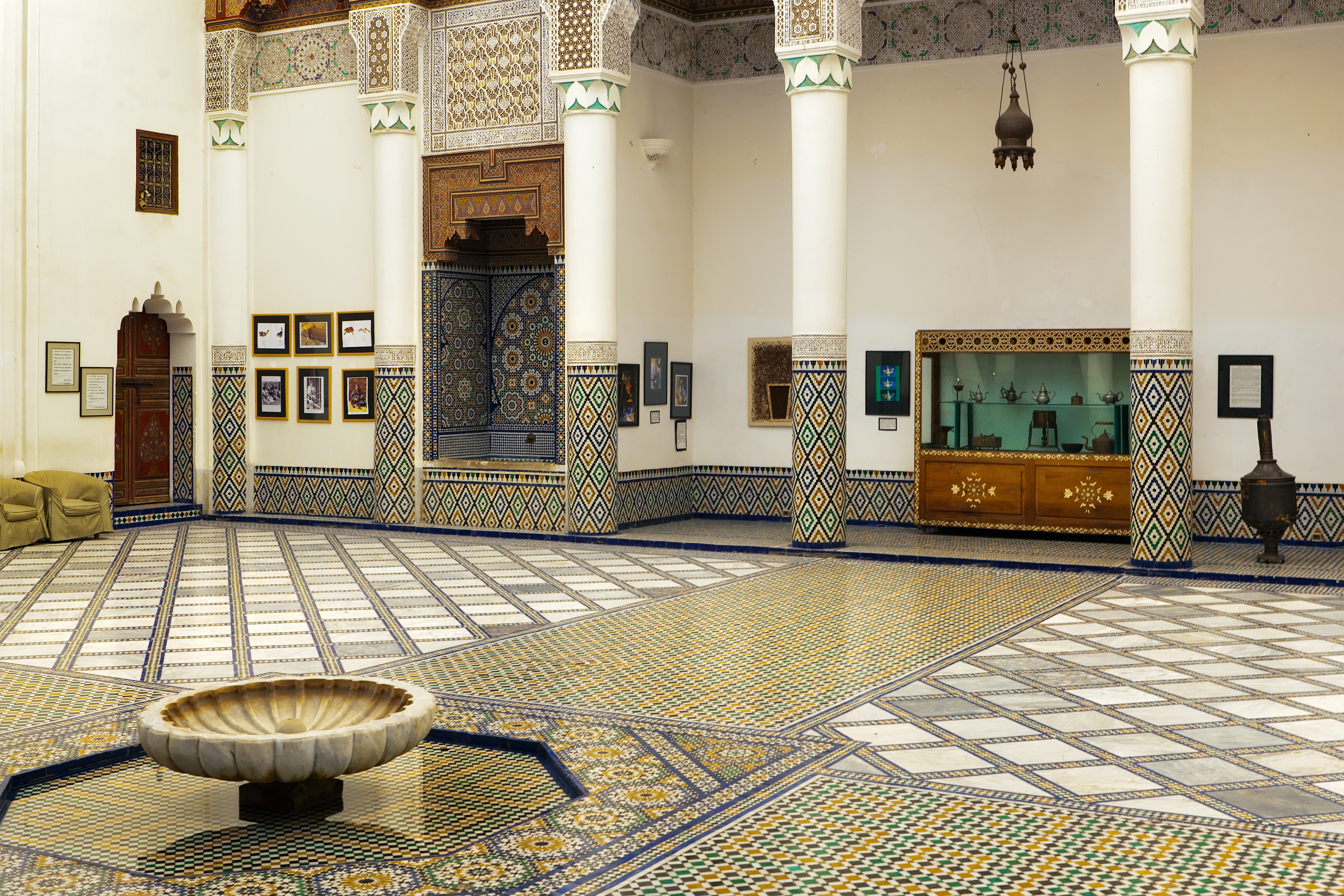
Marrakech Museum

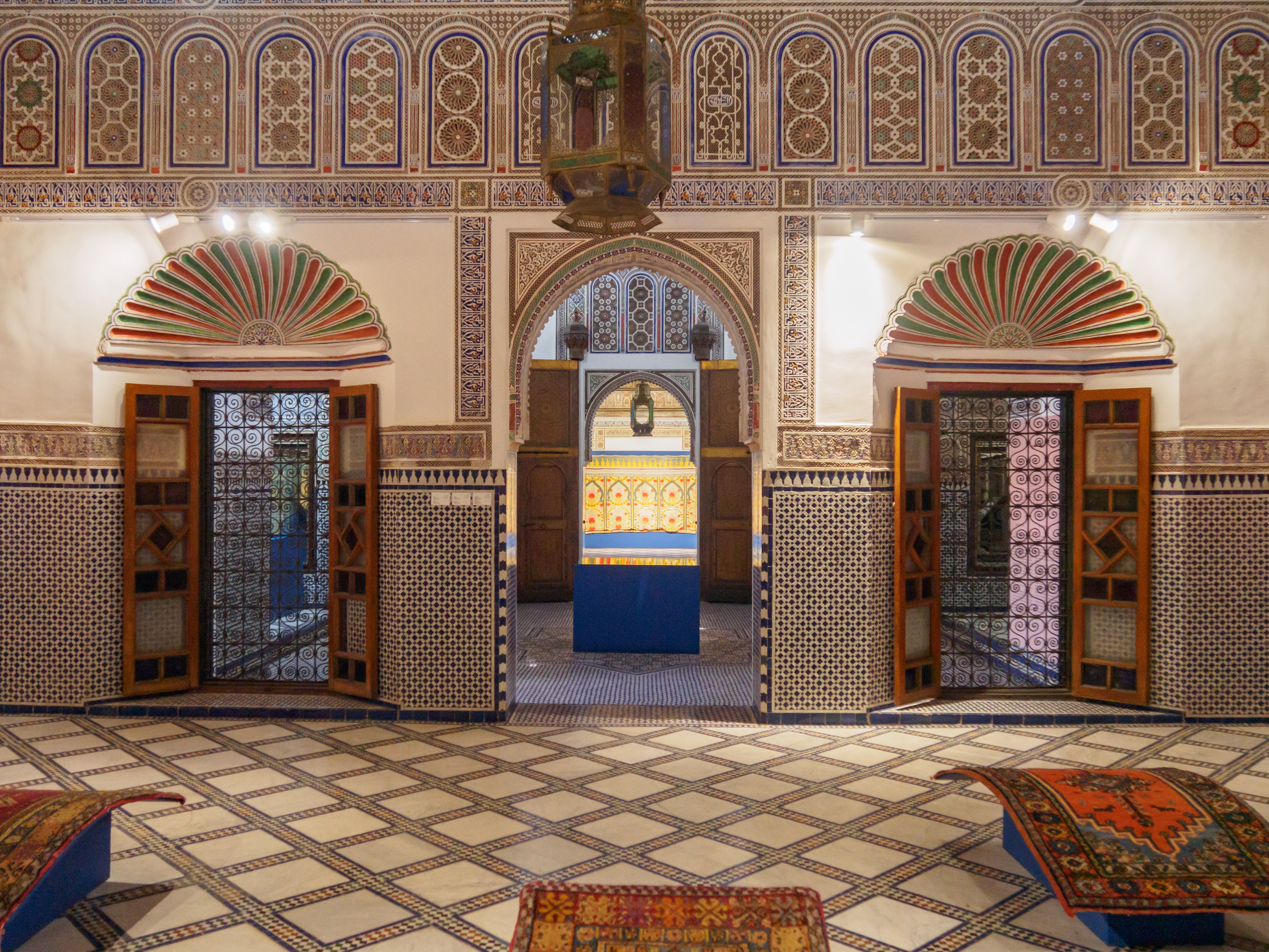
Dar Si Said Museum

Aman Museum for water civilisation in Morocco

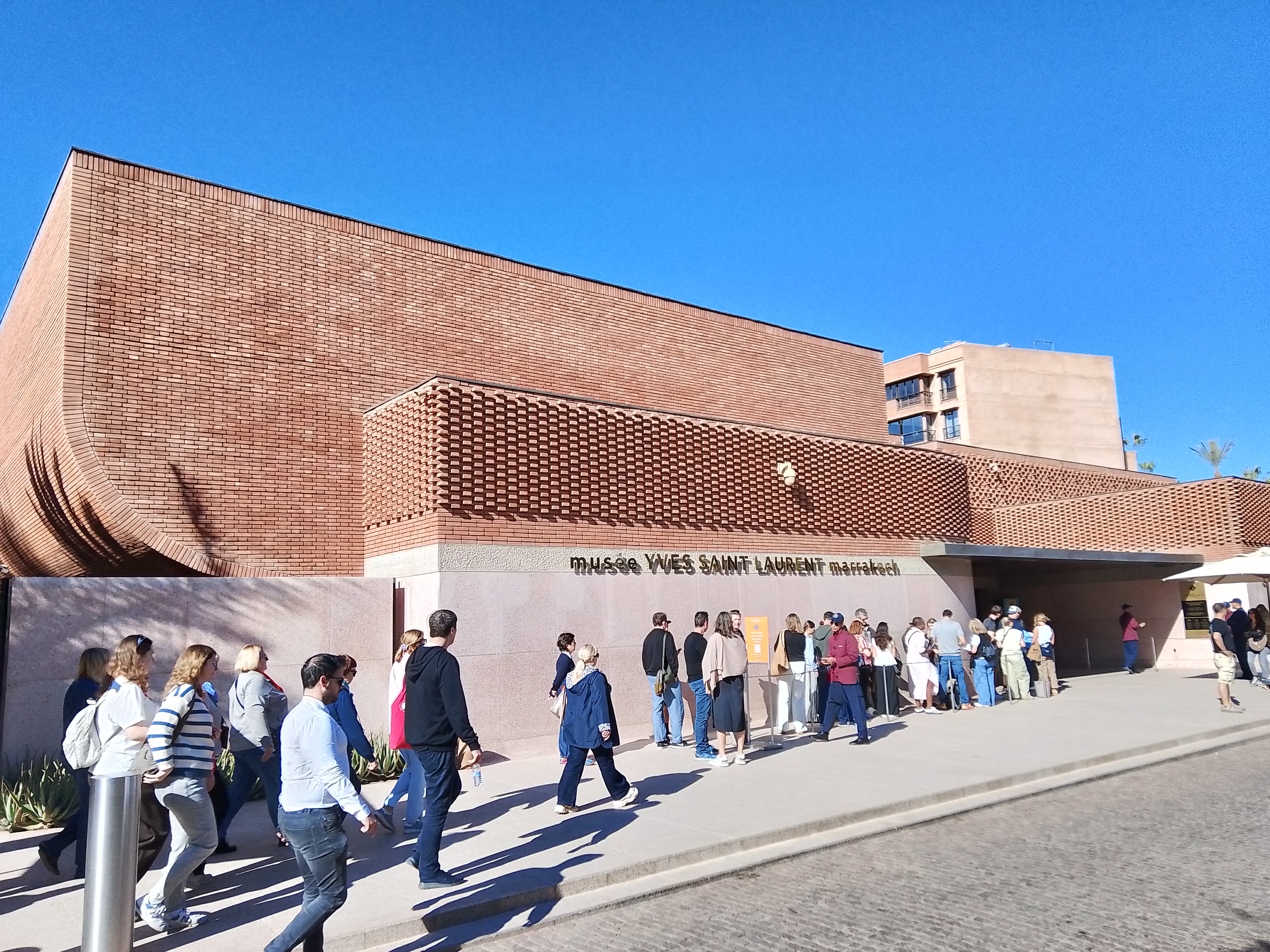
Yves Saint Laurent Museum in Marrakesh

The Marrakech Museum, housed in the Dar Menebhi Palace in the old city centre, was built at the beginning of the 20th century by Mehdi Menebhi. The palace was carefully restored by the Omar Benjelloun Foundation and converted into a museum in 1997. The museum holds exhibits of both modern and traditional Moroccan art together with fine examples of historical books, coins and pottery produced by Moroccan Arab, Berber, and Jewish peoples.

The Dar Si Said Museum is to the north of the Bahia Palace. It was the mansion of Si Said, brother to Grand Vizier Ba Ahmad, and was constructed in the same era as Ahmad's own Bahia Palace. In the 1930s, during the French Protectorate period, it was converted into a museum of Moroccan art and woodcraft. After recent renovations, the museum reopened in 2018 as the National Museum of Weaving and Carpets.

The former home and villa of Jacques Majorelle, a blue-coloured building within the Majorelle Gardens, was converted into the Berber Museum (Musée Pierre Bergé des Arts Berbères) in 2011, after previously serving as a museum of Islamic art. It exhibits a variety of objects of Amazigh (Berber) culture from across different regions of Morocco.

The House of Photography of Marrakech, opened by Patrick Menac’h and Hamid Mergani in 2009, holds exhibits of vintage Moroccan photography from the 1870s to 1950s. The Mouassine Museum, by the same owners, consists of a historic 16th–17th-century house in the Mouassine neighbourhood which has been opened as a museum and cultural venue.

Elsewhere in the medina, the Dar El Bacha hosts the Musée des Confluences, which opened in 2017. The museum holds temporary exhibits highlighting different facets of Moroccan culture as well as various art objects from different cultures across the world. Various other small and often privately owned museums also exist, such as the Musée Boucharouite and the Perfume Museum (Musée du Parfum). Dar Bellarj, an arts center located in a former mansion next to the Ben Youssef Mosque, also occasionally hosts art exhibits. The Tiskiwin Museum is housed in another restored medina mansion and features a collection of artifacts from across the former trans-Saharan trade routes. A number of art galleries and museums are also found outside the medina, in Gueliz and its surrounding districts in the new city.

=== Music, theatre and dance ===
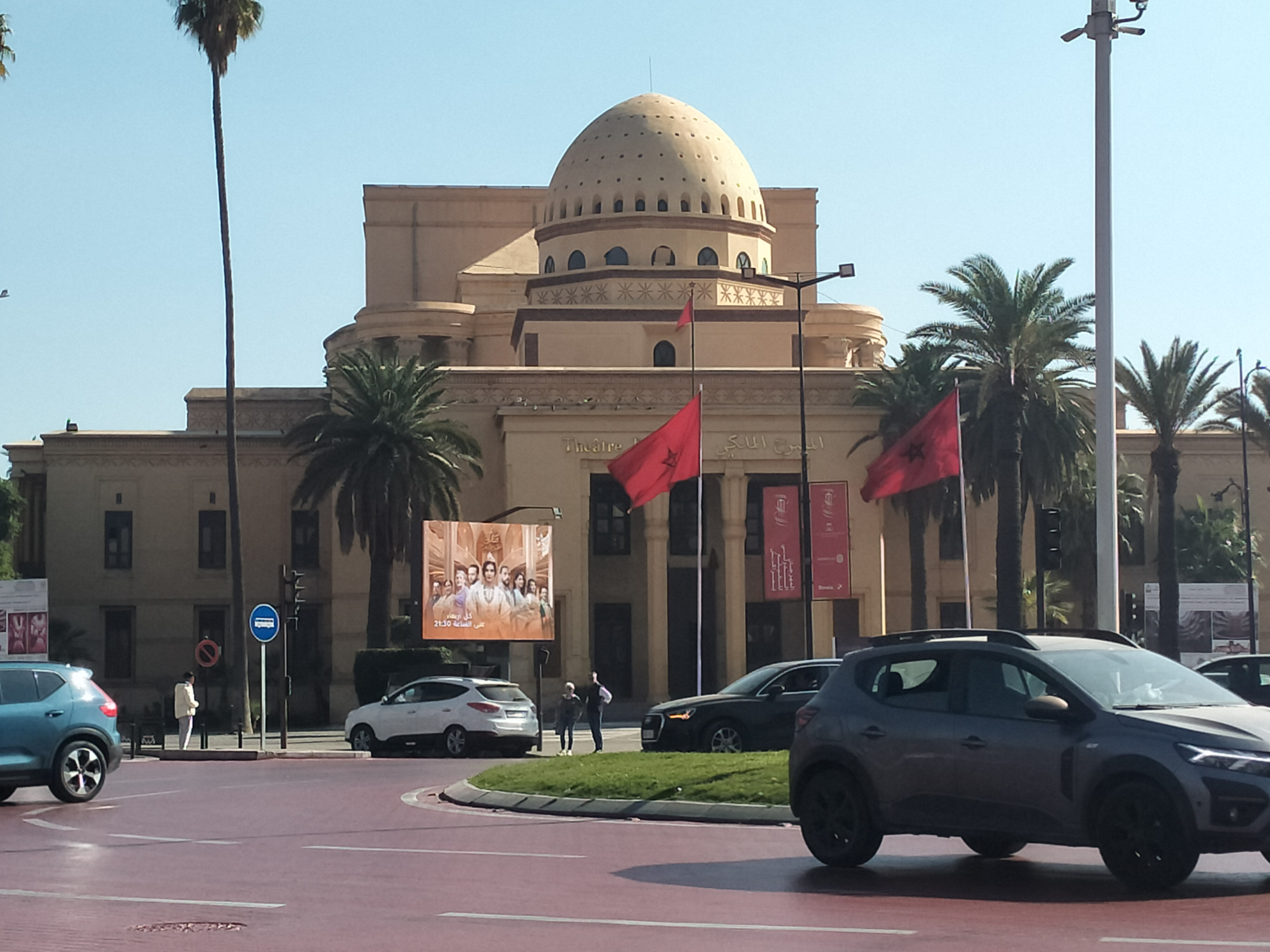
The Royal Theatre of Marrakech

Two types of music are traditionally associated with Marrakesh. Moroccan music is influenced by Andalusian classical music and typified by its oud accompaniment. By contrast, Gnaoua music is loud and funky with a sound reminiscent of the Blues. It is performed on handmade instruments such as castanets, ribabs (three-stringed banjos) and deffs (handheld drums). Gnaoua music's rhythm and crescendo take the audience into a mood of trance; the style is said to have emerged in Marrakesh and Essaouira as a ritual of deliverance from slavery. More recently, several Marrakesh female music groups have also risen to popularity.

The Théâtre Royal de Marrakesh, the Institut Français and Dar Chérifa are major performing arts institutions in the city. The Théâtre Royal, built by Tunisian architect Charles Boccara, puts on theatrical performances of comedy, opera, and dance in Arabic and French. A great number of storytellers, musicians and others also perform outdoor shows to entertain locals and tourists on the Jemaa el-Fnaa, especially at night.

=== Crafts ===
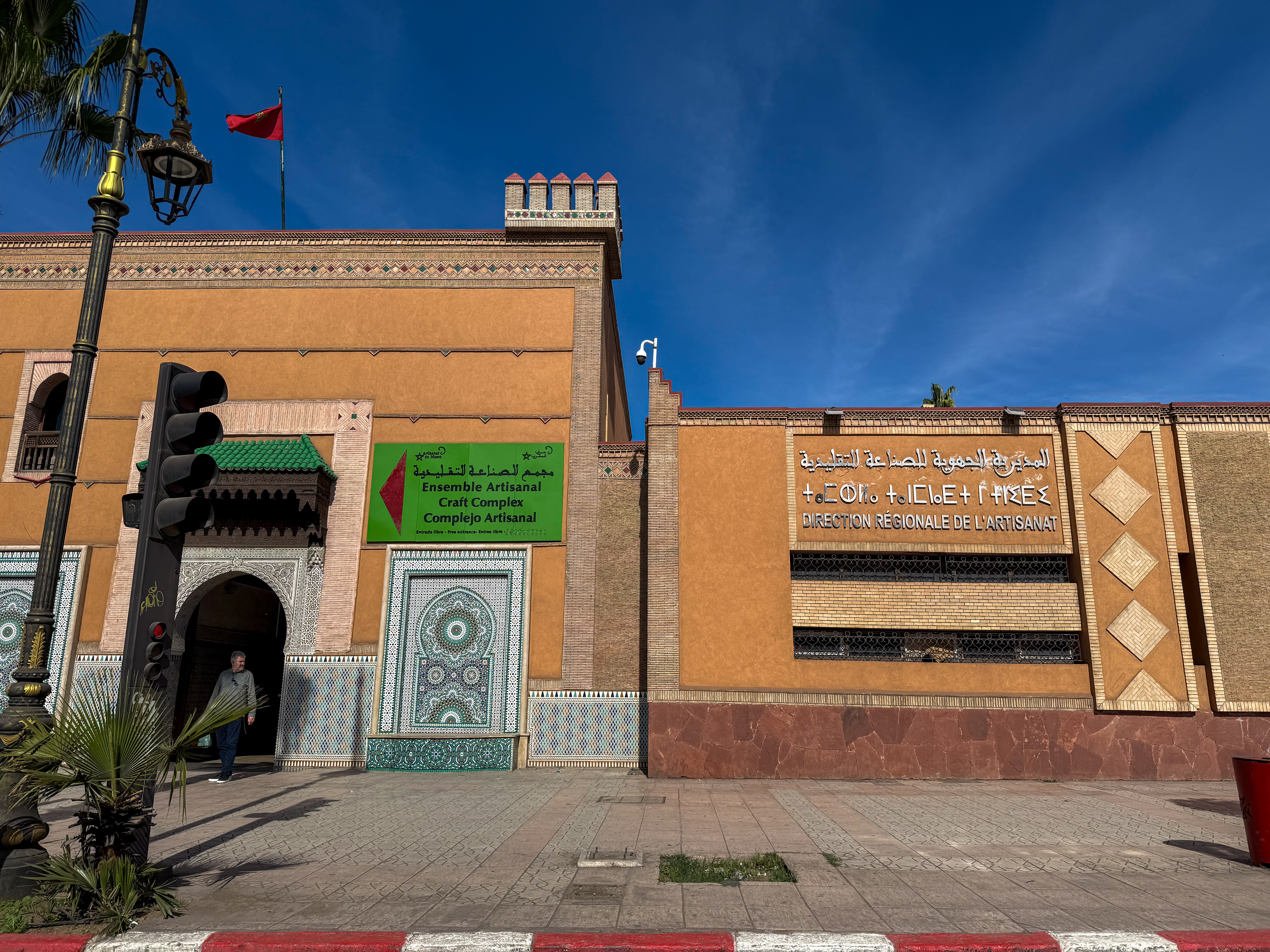
Regional Directorate of Crafts

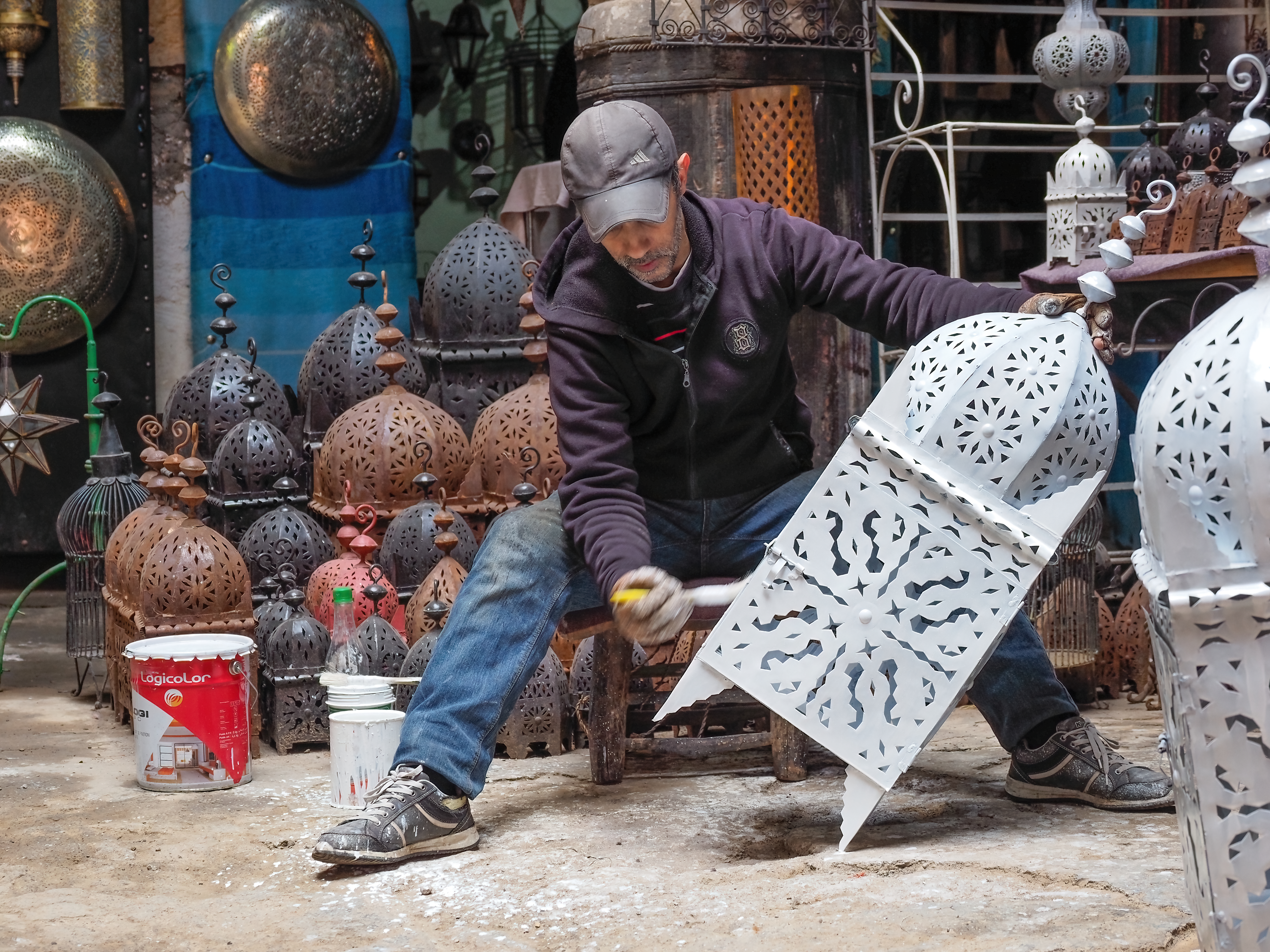
Lamp maker at work, Medina

The arts and crafts of Marrakesh have had a wide and enduring impact on Moroccan handicrafts to the present day. Riad décor is widely used in carpets and textiles, ceramics, woodwork, metal work and zelij. Carpets and textiles are weaved, sewn or embroidered, sometimes used for upholstering. Moroccan women who practice craftsmanship are known as Maalems (expert craftspeople) and make such fine products as Arabic and Berber carpets and shawls made of sabra (another name for rayon, also sometimes called cactus silk). Ceramics are in varying styles in monochrome, a limited tradition depicting bold forms and decorations.

Wood crafts are generally made of cedar, including the riad doors and palace ceilings. Orange wood is used for making ladles known as harira (lentil soup ladles). Thuya craft products are made of caramel coloured thuya, a conifer indigenous to Morocco. Since this species is almost extinct, these trees are being replanted and promoted by the artists' cooperative Femmes de Marrakech.

Metalwork made in Marrakesh includes brass lamps, iron lanterns, candle holders made from recycled sardine tins, and engraved brass teapots and tea trays used in the traditional serving of tea. Contemporary art includes sculpture and figurative paintings. Blue veiled Tuareg figurines and calligraphy paintings are also popular.

=== Festivals ===
Festivals, both national and Islamic, are celebrated in Marrakesh and throughout the country, and some of them are observed as national holidays. Cultural festivals of note held in Marrakesh include the National Folklore Festival, the Marrakech Festival of Popular Arts (in which a variety of famous Moroccan musicians and artists participate), international folklore festival Marrakech Folklore Days and the Berber Festival. The International Film Festival of Marrakech, which aspires to be the North African version of the Cannes Film Festival, was established in 2001. The festival, which showcases over 100 films from around the world annually, has attracted Hollywood stars such as Martin Scorsese, Francis Ford Coppola, Susan Sarandon, Jeremy Irons, Roman Polanski and many European, Arab and Indian film stars. The Marrakech Bienniale was established in 2004 by Vanessa Branson as a cultural festival in various disciplines, including visual arts, cinema, video, literature, performing arts, and architecture.

=== Food ===
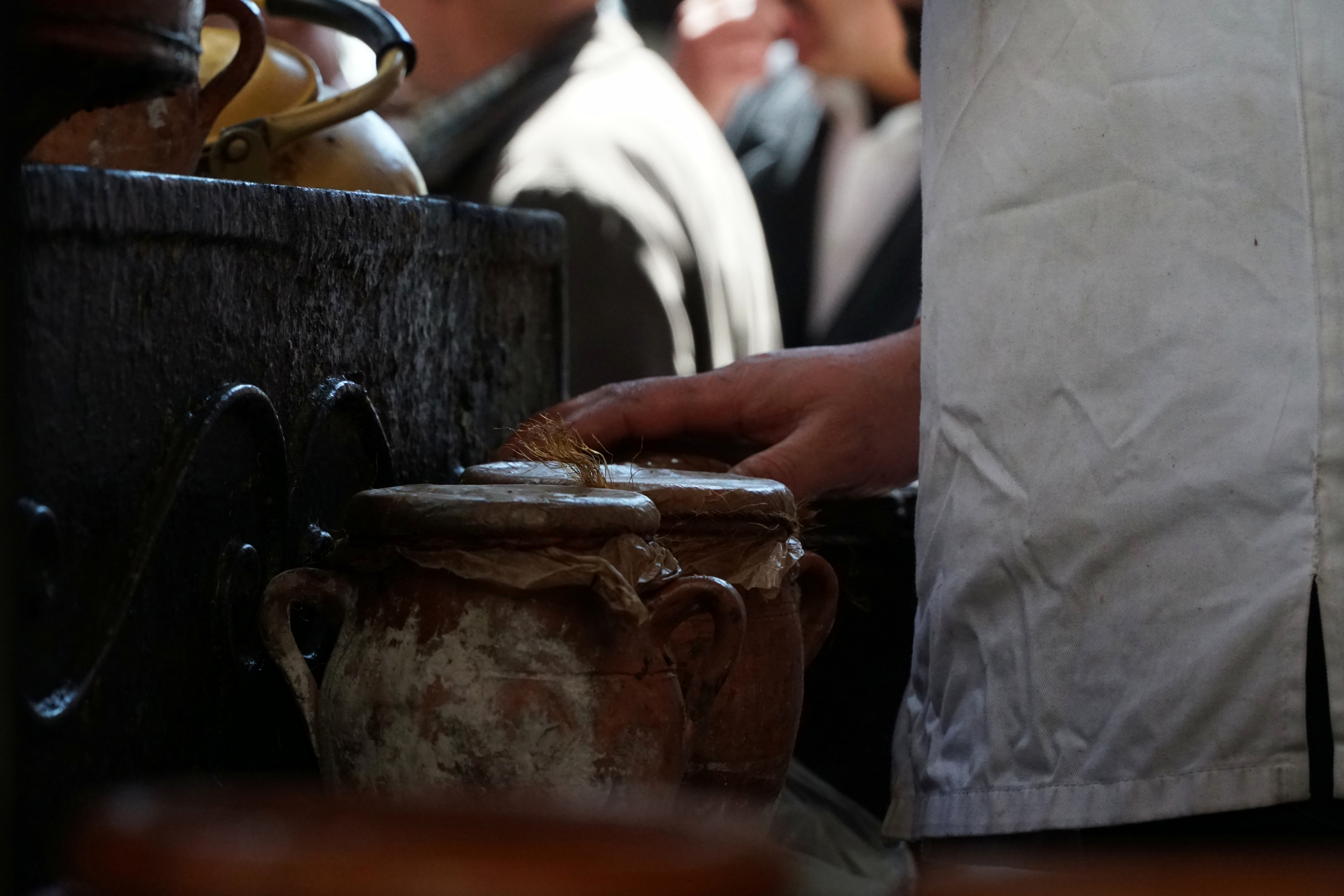
Tanjias prepared in terracotta pots sealed with paper

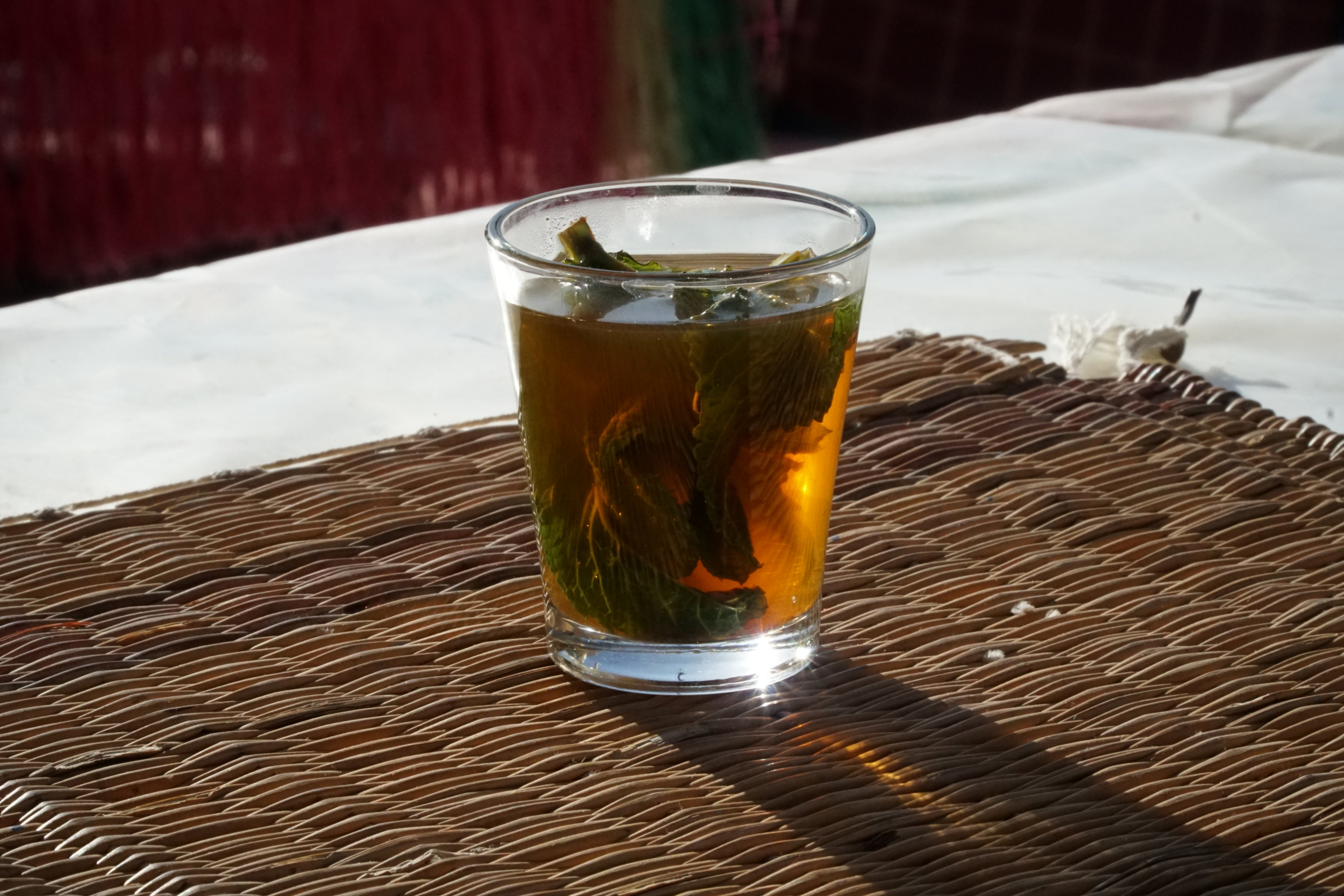
Moroccan mint tea prepared with gunpowder tea, fresh mint, and sugar

Surrounded by lemon, orange, and olive groves, the city's culinary characteristics are rich and heavily spiced but not hot, using various preparations of Ras el hanout (which means "Head of the shop"), a blend of dozens of spices which include ash berries, chilli, cinnamon, grains of paradise, monk's pepper, nutmeg, and turmeric. A specialty of the city and the symbol of its cuisine is tanjia marrakshia, affectionately referred to as bint ar-rimad (بنت الرماد "daughter of the ash"), a local meal prepared with beef meat, spices, and smen and slow-cooked in a ceramic pot in traditional oven in hot ashes. Tajines can be prepared with chicken, lamb, beef or fish, adding fruit, olives and preserved lemon, vegetables and spices, including cumin, peppers, saffron, turmeric, and ras el hanout. The meal is prepared in a tajine pot and slow-cooked with steam. Another version of tajine includes vegetables and chickpeas seasoned with flower petals. Tajines may also be basted with "smen" Moroccan ghee that has a flavour similar to blue cheese.

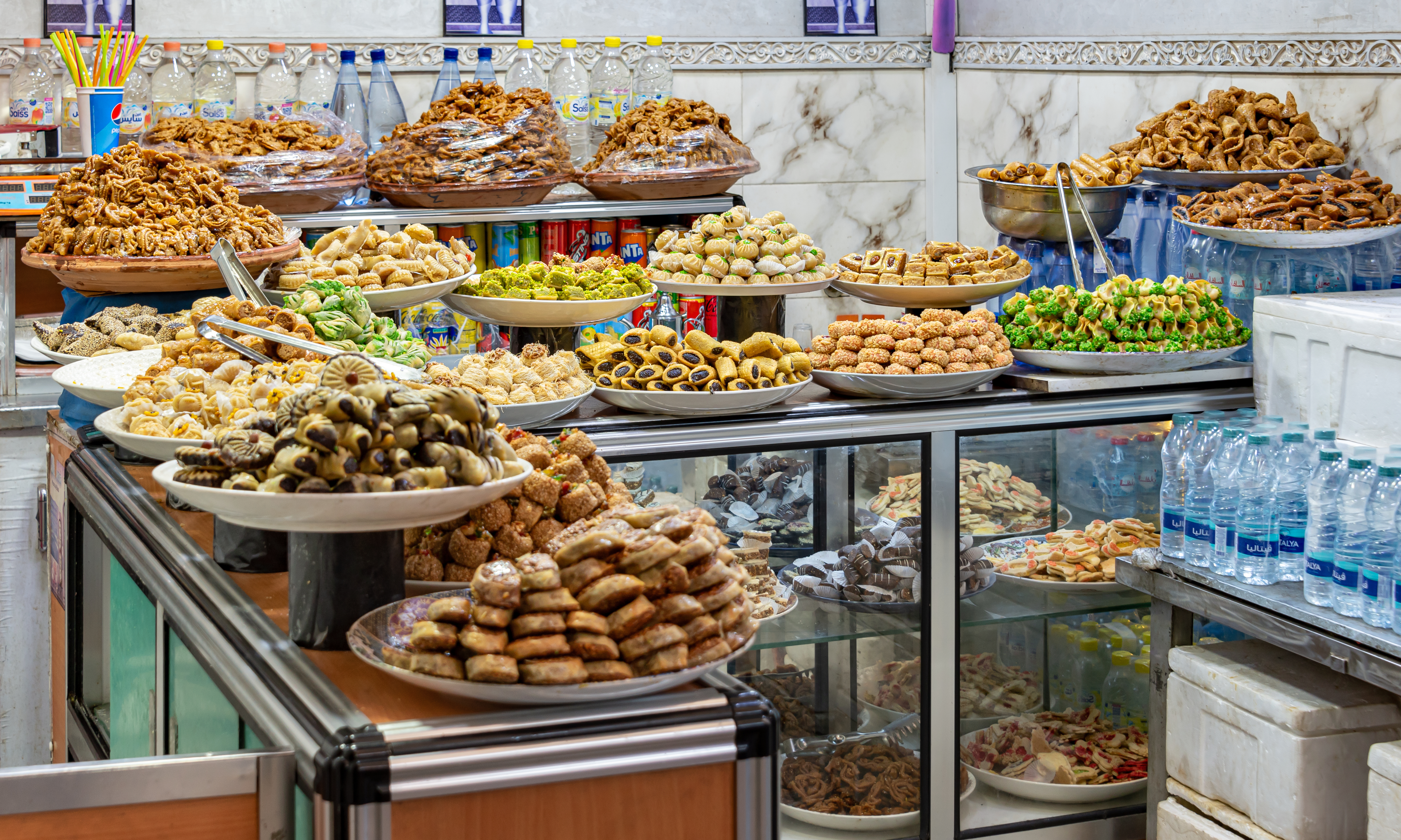
A variety of sweets on display.

The desserts of Marrakesh include chebakia (sesame spice cookies usually prepared and served during Ramadan), tartlets of filo dough with dried fruit, or cheesecake with dates.

Shrimp, chicken and lemon-filled briouats are another traditional specialty of Marrakesh. Rice is cooked with saffron, raisins, spices, and almonds, while couscous may have added vegetables. A pastilla is a filo-wrapped pie stuffed with minced chicken or pigeon that has been prepared with almonds, cinnamon, spices and sugar. Harira soup in Marrakesh typically includes lamb with a blend of chickpeas, lentils, vermicelli, and tomato paste, seasoned with coriander, spices and parsley. Kefta (mince meat), liver in crépinette, merguez and tripe stew are commonly sold at the stalls of Jemaa el-Fnaa.

The Moroccan tea culture is practiced in Marrakesh; green tea with mint is served with sugar from a curved teapot spout into small glasses. Another popular non-alcoholic drink is orange juice. Under the Almoravids, alcohol consumption was common; historically, hundreds of Jews produced and sold alcohol in the city. In the present day, alcohol is sold in some hotel bars and restaurants.

== Education ==
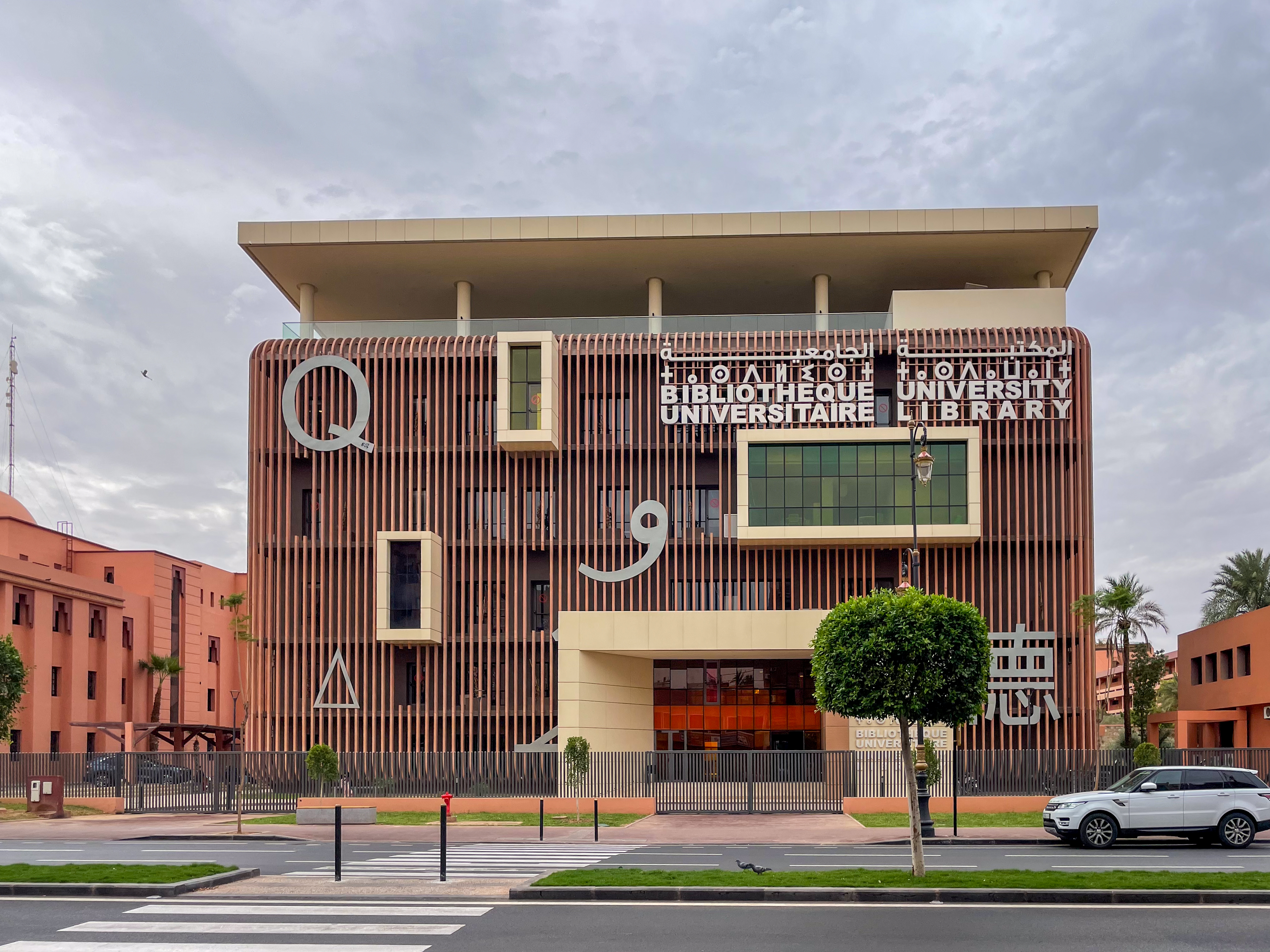
Cadi Ayyad University Library

National School Of Business and Management - Marrakesh

Marrakesh has several universities and schools, including Cadi Ayyad University (also known as the University of Marrakech), and its component, the École nationale des sciences appliquées de Marrakech (ENSA Marrakech), which was created in 2000 by the Ministry of Higher Education and specializes in engineering and scientific research. Cadi Ayyad University was established in 1978 and operates 13 institutions in the Marrakech Tensift Elhaouz and Abda Doukkala regions of Morocco in four main cities, including Kalaat Sraghna, Essaouira and Safi in addition to Marrakech.

Sup de Co Marrakech, also known as the École Supérieure de Commerce de Marrakech, is a private four-year college that was founded in 1987 by Ahmed Bennis. The school is affiliated with the École Supérieure de Commerce of Toulouse, France.

Private University of Marrakech was founded in 2005 by Mohamed Kabbadj, it extends over 22 hectares and hosts 2,200 students

=== Ben Youssef Madrasa ===
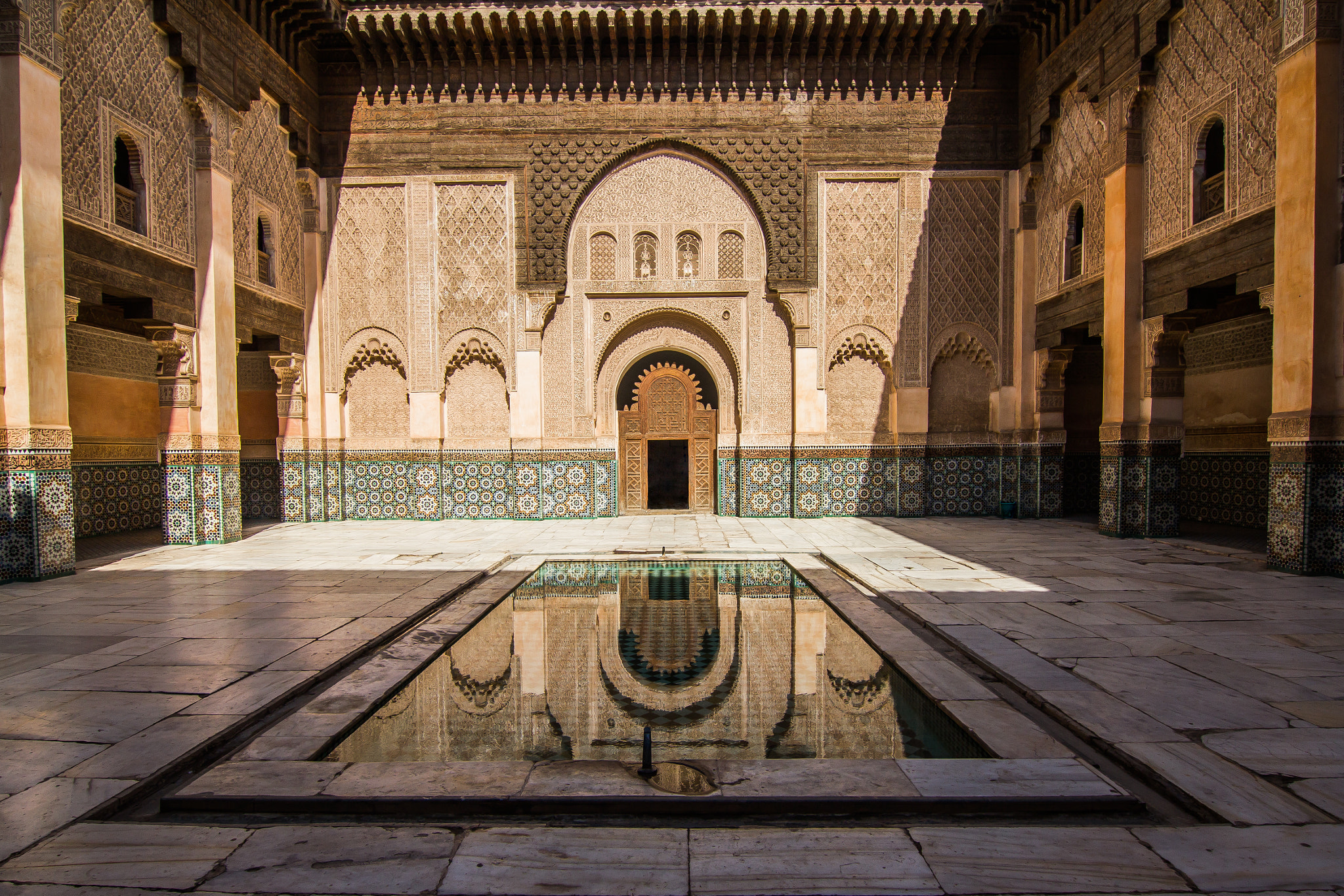
The courtyard of the Ben Youssef Madrasa

The Ben Youssef Madrasa, north of the Medina, was an Islamic college in Marrakesh named after the Almoravid sultan Ali ibn Yusuf (1106–1142) who expanded the city and its influence considerably. It is the largest madrasa in all of Morocco and was one of the largest theological colleges in Northern Africa, at one time housing as many as 900 students.

This education complex specialized in Quranic law and was linked to similar institutions in Fez, Taza, Salé, and Meknes. The Madrasa was constructed by the Saadian Sultan Abdallah al-Ghalib (1557–1574) in 1564 as the largest and most prestigious madrasa in Morocco. The construction ordered by Abdallah al-Ghalib was completed in 1565, as attested by the inscription in the prayer room. Its 130 student dormitory cells cluster around a courtyard richly carved in cedar, marble and stucco. In accordance with Islam, the carvings contain no representation of humans or animals, consisting entirely of inscriptions and geometric patterns. One of the school's best known teachers was Mohammed al-Ifrani (1670–1745). After a temporary closure beginning in 1960, the building was refurbished and reopened to the public as a historical site in 1982.

== Sport ==
Football clubs based in Marrakesh include Najm de Marrakech, KAC Marrakech, Mouloudia de Marrakech and Chez Ali Club de Marrakech. The city contains the Circuit International Automobile Moulay El Hassan a race track which hosts the World Touring Car Championship and from 2017 FIA Formula E. The Marrakech Marathon is also held here. Roughly 5000 runners turn out for the event annually. Also, here takes place Grand Prix Hassan II tennis tournament (on clay) part of ATP World Tour series.

Golf is a popular sport in Marrakech. The city has three golf courses just outside the city limits and played almost through the year. The three main courses are the Golf de Amelikis on the road to Ourazazate, the Palmeraie Golf Palace near the Palmeraie, and the Royal Golf Club, the oldest of the three courses.

== Transport ==
=== Bus ===
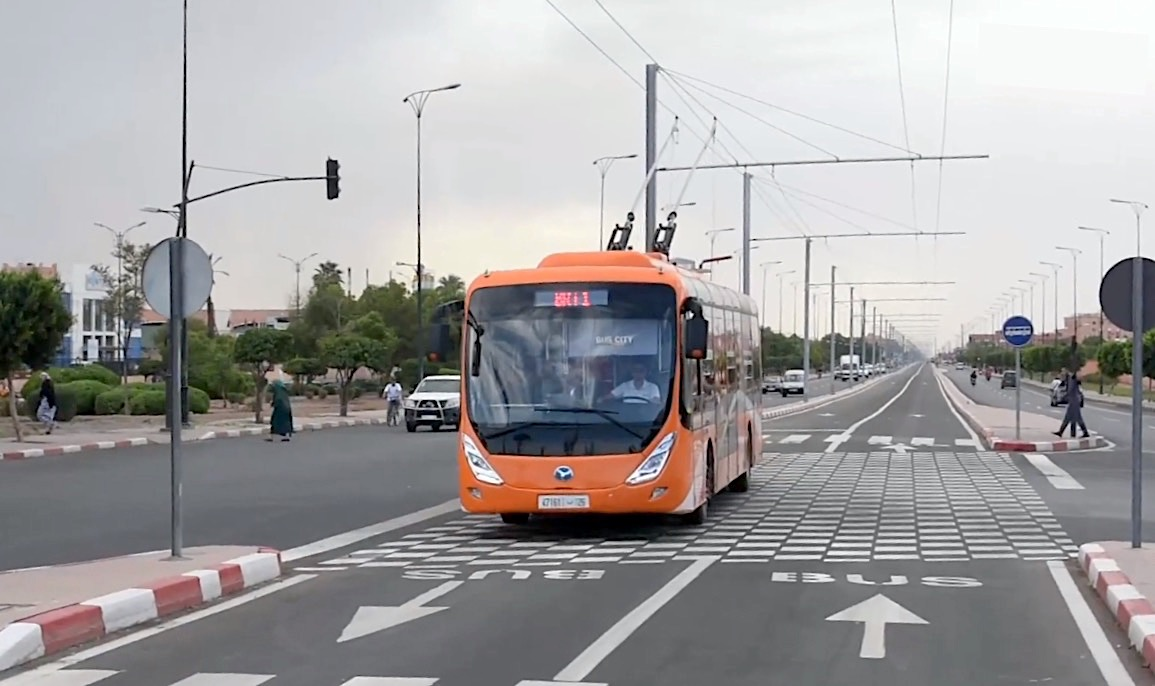
BRT Marrakesh

BRT Marrakesh, a bus rapid transit system using trolleybuses was opened in 2017.

=== Rail ===
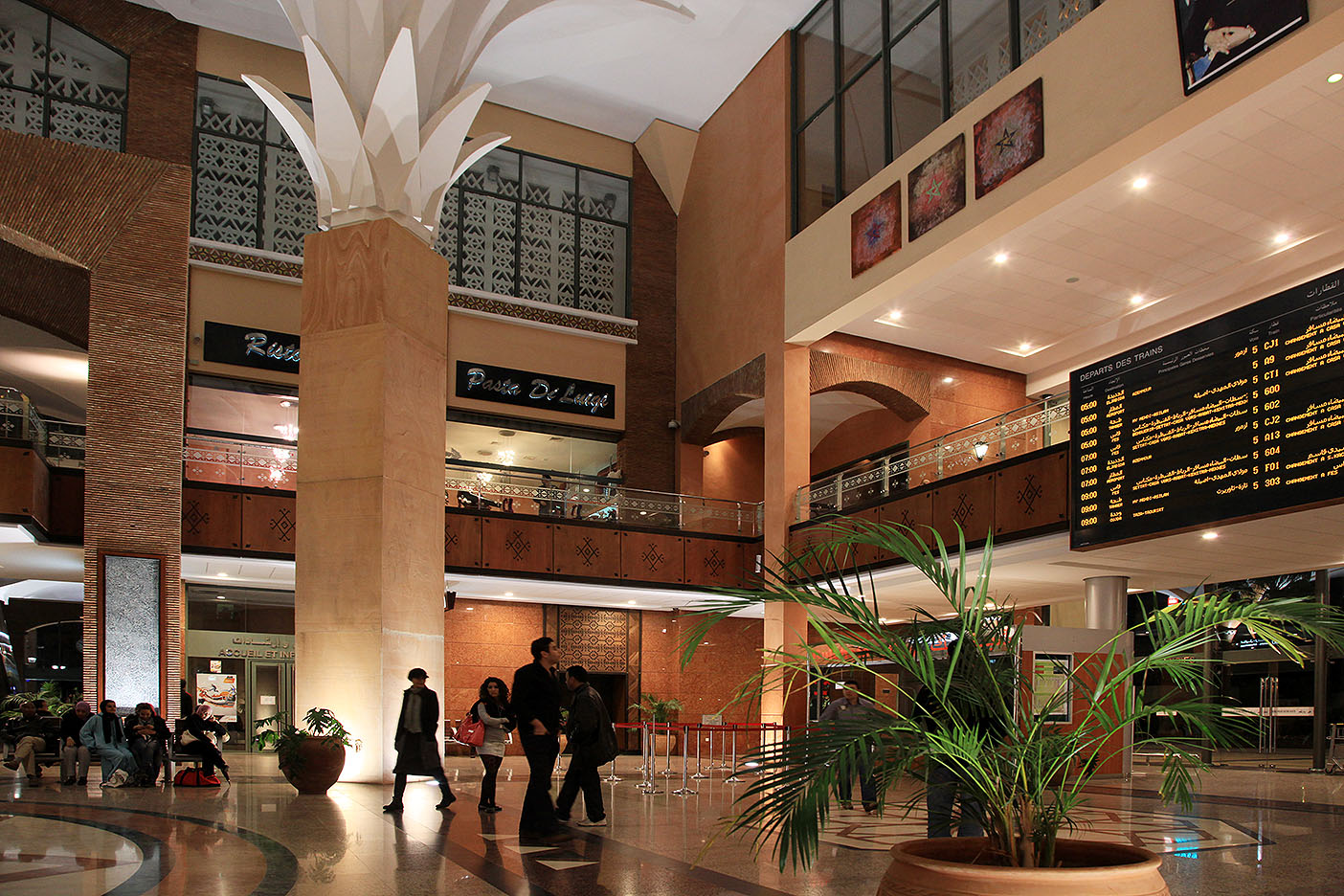
Marrakesh railway station

The Marrakesh railway station is linked by several trains running daily to other major cities in Morocco such as Casablanca, Tangier, Fez, Meknes and Rabat. The Kenitra-Marrakesh high-speed rail line project is currently under construction and will link the city to the national high-speed rail network.

An in progress Regional Express Network (RER) project aims to enhance urban mobility across the Marrakech region, with 3 stations in Marrakech proper and connecting to Sidi Bou Othmane and Benguerir.

=== Road ===
The main road network within and around Marrakesh is well paved. The major highway connecting Marrakesh with Casablanca to the north is the A7, a toll expressway, 210 km (130 mi) in length. The road from Marrakesh to Settat, a 146 km (91 mi) stretch, was inaugurated by King Mohammed VI in April 2007, completing the 558 km (347 mi) highway to Tangiers. Highway A7 connects also Marrakesh to Agadir, 233 km (145 mi) to the southwest.

=== Air ===
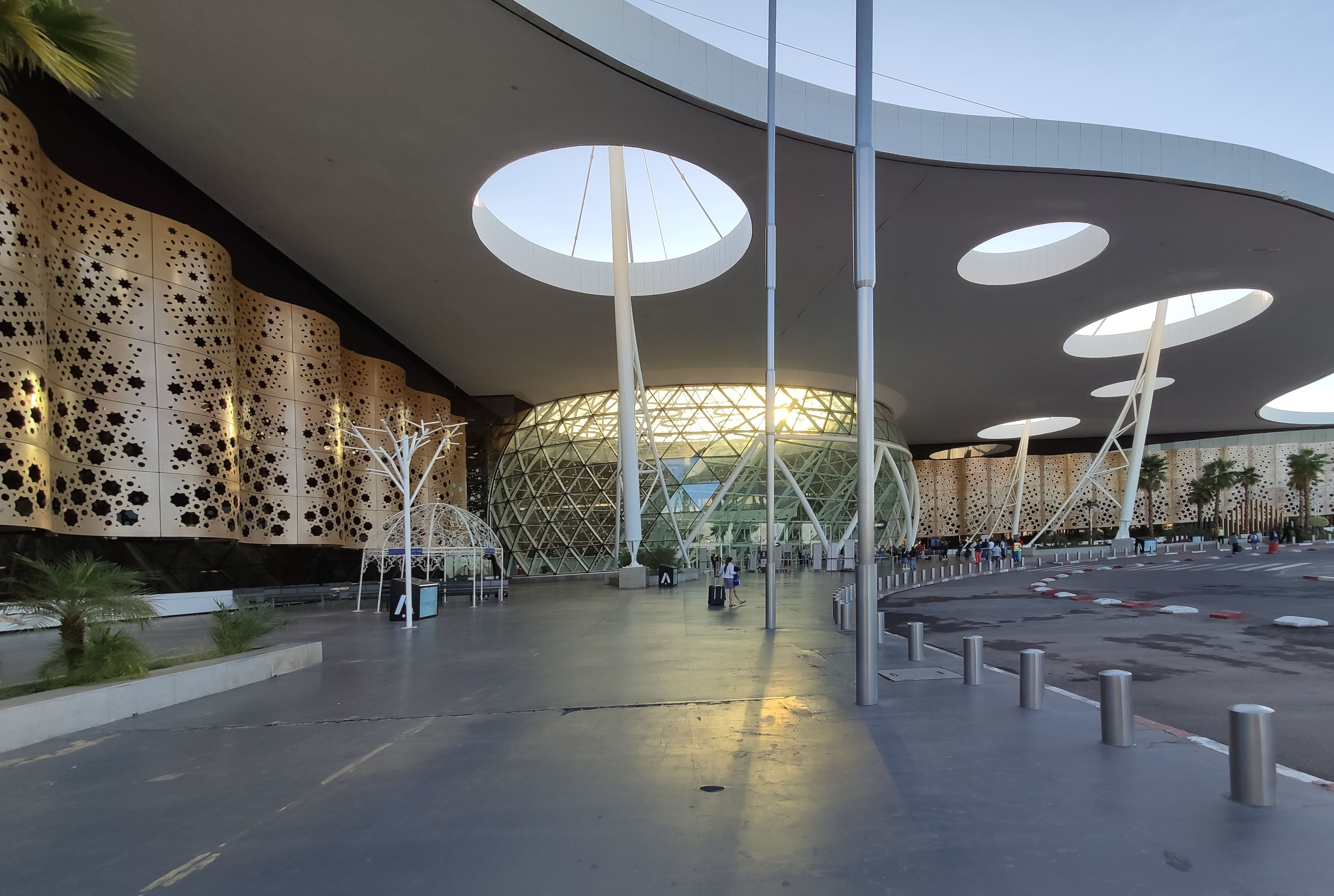
Marrakesh Menara Airport

The Marrakesh-Menara Airport (RAK) is 3 km (1.9 mi) southwest of the city centre. It is an international facility that receives several European flights as well as flights from Casablanca, the United States, and several Arab nations.

The airport is at an elevation of 471 metres (1,545 ft) at 31°36′25″N 008°02′11″W. It has two formal passenger terminals; these are more or less combined into one large terminal. A third terminal is being built. The existing T1 and T2 terminals offer a space of 42,000 m^{2} (450,000 sq ft) and have a capacity of 4.5 million passengers per year. The blacktopped runway is 4.5 km (2.8 mi) long and 45 m (148 ft) wide. The airport has parking space for 14 Boeing 737 and four Boeing 747 aircraft. The separate freight terminal has 340 m^{2} (3,700 sq ft) of covered space.

== Healthcare ==
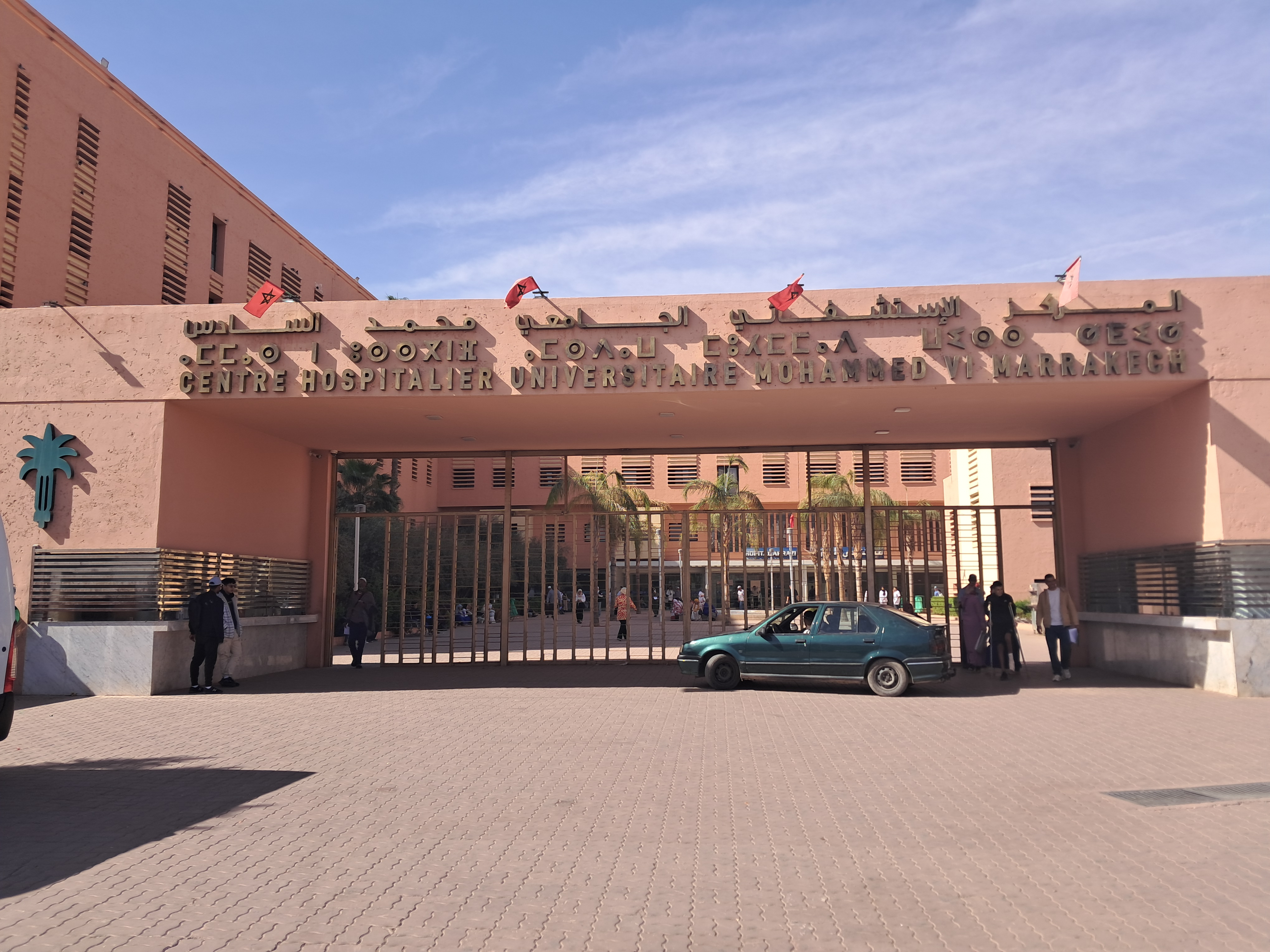
CHU Mohammed-VI (Marrakech)

Marrakesh has long been an important centre for healthcare in Morocco, and the regional rural and urban populations alike are reliant upon hospitals in the city. The psychiatric hospital installed by the Almohad caliph Ya'qub al-Mansur in the 12th century was described by contemporary historian 'Abd al-Wahid al-Marrakushi as one of the greatest in the world at the time. A strong Andalusi influence was evident in this period, as one of the physicians in the hospital was from Denia in eastern Spain and many of the personal physicians of the caliphs came from places such as Seville, Zaragoza and Beja.

A severe strain has been placed upon the healthcare facilities of the city in the last decade as the city population has grown dramatically. Ibn Tofail University Hospital is one of the major hospitals of the city. In February 2001, the Moroccan government signed a loan agreement worth eight million U.S. dollars with The OPEC Fund for International Development to help improve medical services in and around Marrakesh, which led to expansions of the Ibn Tofail and Ibn Nafess hospitals. Seven new buildings were constructed, with a total floor area of 43,000 square metres (460,000 sq ft). New radiotherapy and medical equipment was provided and 29,000 square metres (310,000 sq ft) of existing hospital space was rehabilitated.

In 2009, king Mohammed VI inaugurated a regional psychiatric hospital in Marrakesh, built by the Mohammed V Foundation for Solidarity, costing 22 million dirhams (approximately 2.7 million U.S. dollars). The hospital has 194 beds, covering an area of 3 hectares (7.4 acres). Mohammed VI has also announced plans for the construction of a 450 million dirham military hospital in Marrakesh.

== International relations ==
Marrakesh is twinned with:

- Granada, Spain
- Marseille, France
- Granby, Canada
- Ningbo, China
- Scottsdale, United States
- Sousse, Tunisia
- Timbuktu, Mali

== Notable people ==
- Ibn al-Banna' al-Marrakushi, 13th-century mathematician and astronomer
- 'Abd al-Wahid al-Marrakushi, 13th-century historian
- Abu Ali al-Hasan al-Marrakushi, 13th-century astronomer and mathematician
- Ibn 'Idhari, 13th/14th-century historian
- Muhammad al-Ifrani, 17th/18th-century historian and biographer
- Ahmed Bahja, former footballer
- Hasna Benhassi, former middle-distance runner
- Mahi Binebine, painter and novelist
- Tahar El Khalej, former footballer
- Nadia Farès, actress
- Hadj Mohammed Mesfewi, serial killer
- Abdelali Mhamdi, professional goalkeeper
- Adil Ramzi, former footballer
- Salaheddine Saidi, footballer
- Tahar Tamsamani, former boxer
- Mordechai Vanunu, Israeli nuclear whistleblower (born in Marrakesh)
- Yassir Zabiri, footballer
- Moulay Hafid Elalamy, businessman and politician
- Marc Lasry, Moroccan American businessman & billionaire
- Manal Benchlikha, Moroccan pop singer

== See also ==
- Arab Astronomical Society (2016)
- List of people from Marrakesh
- Marrakesh in popular culture
- Massira, Marrakech
