= Seven Saints of Marrakesh =

Patron Saints of Marrakesh

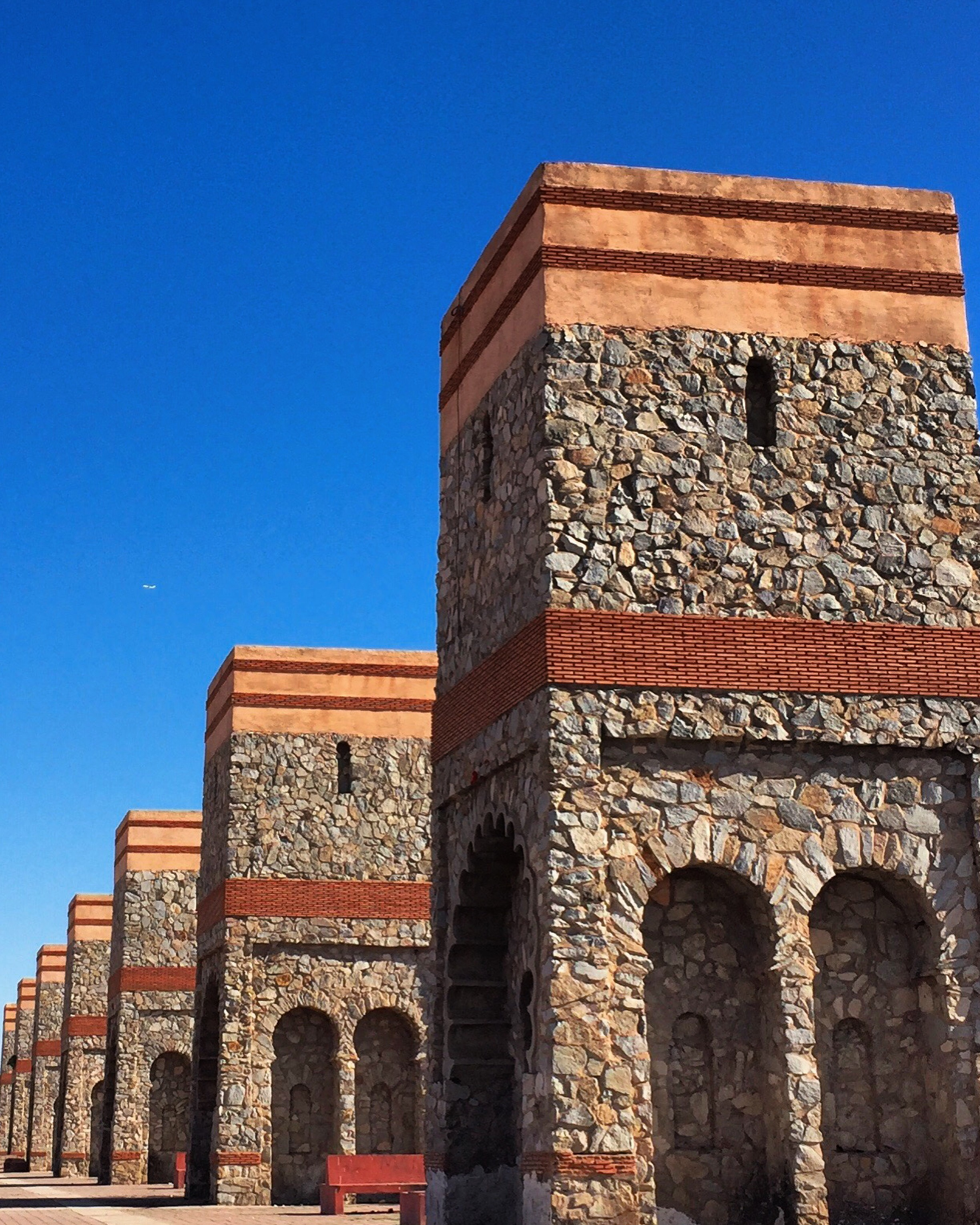
A monument commemorating the Seven Saints of Marrakesh, erected in 2005 just outside Bab Doukkala (the northeastern gate of the medina)

The Seven Saints of Marrakesh or Patron Saints of Marrakesh (Arabic: سبعة رجال, romanized: Sabʿatu Rijāl, lit. 'Seven Men') are seven historical Muslim figures buried in Marrakesh, Morocco. Each of them was a famous Muslim jurisprudent, scholar or wali (Sufi saint) venerated for their piety or other mystical attributes. Their tombs form the basis of a centuries-old annual pilgrimage or ziyara, during which visitors pray at each of their tombs over seven days.

== Historical background ==
The tradition of a ziyara to the tombs of the Seven Saints of Marrakesh was created on the initiative of the Alawi sultan Ismail Ibn Sharif (ruled 1672–1727) in the late 17th century. The motivation for this act was a political desire to exploit the popular influence of the zawiyas (Sufi brotherhood institutions) and to counter the popularity of the "Seven Saints" of the Regraga Berber tribe, which were the basis of another pilgrimage at Djebel al-Hadid near Essaouira at the time. There were also other examples of "Seven Saints" elsewhere in Morocco, including in Fes, which in turn may have had a precedent in the legend of the Seven Sleepers mentioned in the Qur'an. It may also have been significant that the "saints" selected for the new pilgrimage were mostly of Arab background, in opposition to the Berber saints of the Regraga-sponsored pilgrimage. Moulay Isma'il charged an influential religious figure called Abu 'Ali al-Hasan al-Yusi, a man of Berber origin who was familiar with the country's zawiyas, with instituting the pilgrimage in Marrakesh.

The pilgrimage was ultimately beneficial to Marrakesh by enhancing the city's spiritual reputation (though the city was already home to the tombs of many other awliya) and attracting travelers to boost its economy. It became so well known that the "Seven Men" became another name for Marrakesh itself. Even later sultans like Mohammed ben Abdallah, who were known for being inclined to Wahhabism, a puritanical school of thought opposed to heterodox practices such as the veneration of saints, nonetheless patronized the zawiyas and tombs of the Seven Saints and expanded or restored their shrines.

Today the practice is not as widely followed as it once was, but the tombs and zawiyas are nonetheless important shrines in the city. In 2005 the mayor of Marrakesh inaugurated a monument outside Bab Doukkala (the northeastern gate of the old city), known as Place des Septs Saints (Seven Saints' Square or Plaza), which commemorates the Seven Saints.

== Description of the pilgrimage ==
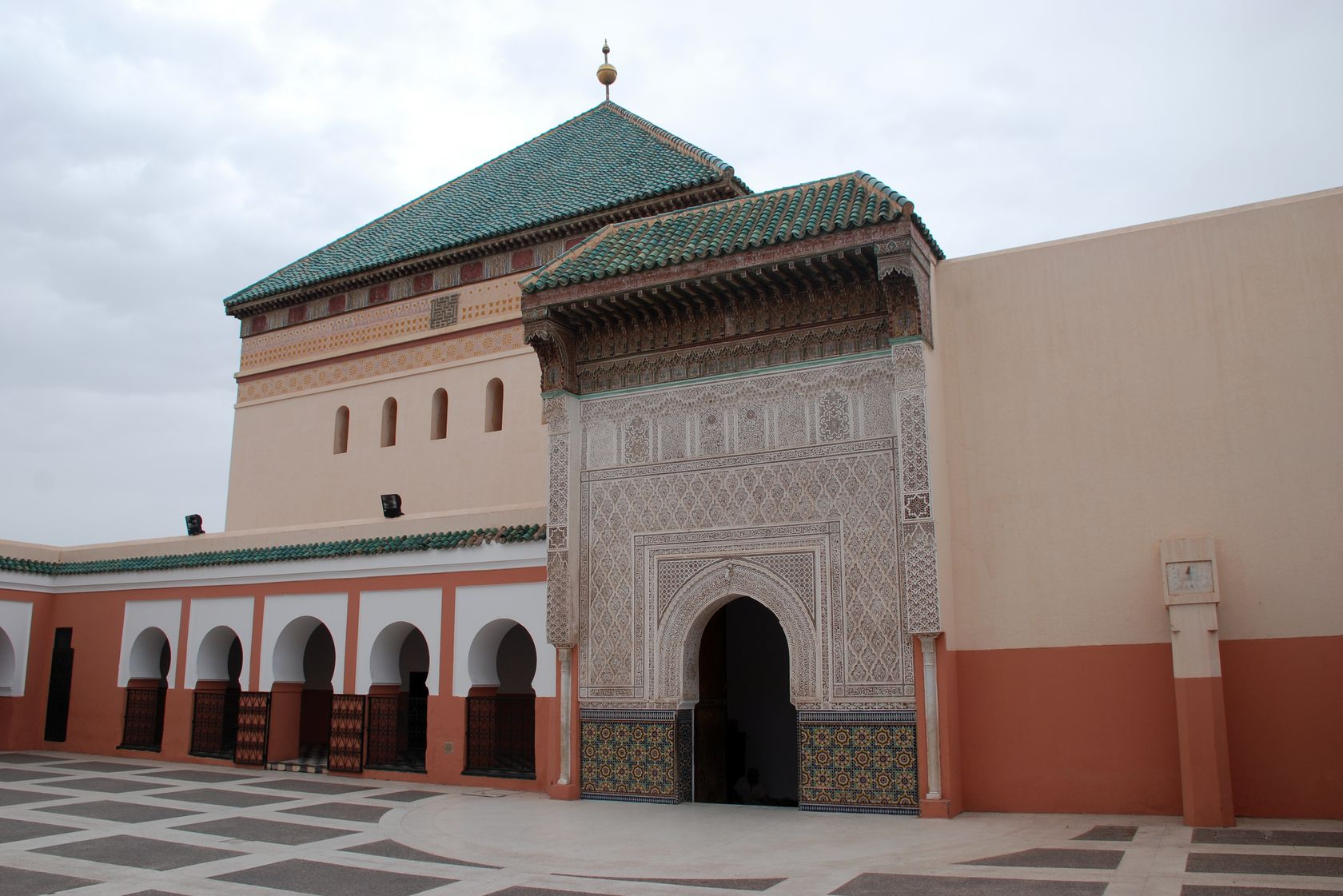
The mausoleum Sidi Abu al-Abbas as-Sabti, the most important patron saint of Marrakesh. The mausoleum is part of a major zawiya dedicated to him in the northern part of the old city.

The pilgrimage takes place over most of a week, starting on Tuesday and ending on Monday. It also proceeds in a circular fashion around the city, starting in the southeast and finishing in the southwest, mimicking the counterclockwise direction of the circumambulation of the Kaaba in Mecca. Each day the pilgrims would stop and pray at a different tomb. The first stop was the tomb of Sidi Yusuf ibn 'Ali Sanhaji near Bab Aghmat (the southeastern gate of the city) on Tuesday. On Wednesday they entered the city and stopped at the tomb of Qadi 'Iyyad. On Thursday they exited the city via Bab Aylan and passed by Bab el-Khemis to visit the mausoleum of Sidi Bel Abbes as-Sabti (which was outside the city walls up until the 18th century). On Friday they moved to the mausoleum of Sidi Ben Sliman al-Jazuli, then to the tomb of Sidi Abd al-'Aziz at-Taba'a (a disciple of al-Jazuli) on Saturday, and then to the mausoleum of Sidi Abdallah al-Ghazwani (a disciple of at-Taba'a) on Sunday. Lastly, on Monday, they ended at the tomb of Sidi al-Suhayli near Bab er-Robb (the southwestern gate of the city).

== The Seven Saints and their shrines ==
The Seven Saints of Marrakesh are listed below in chronological order of their deaths — as opposed to the order in which their tombs are visited during the pilgrimage (see previous section). Note that there are many alternate spellings of the saints' names (due to varying transliterations of Arabic names). The name "Sidi" is an honorific common in the Maghreb.

- Qadi 'Iyyad ibn Musa (also known as Qadi Ayyad), died 1149. He is buried in a mausoleum near Bab Aylan, one of the western gates of the old city.
- Sidi al-Suhayli (also known as Imam al-Suhayli, also spelled al-Soheili or al-Souheili), died 1185. His tomb is located in the cemetery named after him, just outside Bab er-Robb, on the site of a former city gate known as Bab ash-Sharia.
- Sidi Yusuf ibn 'Ali as-Sanhaji (also known as Sidi Youssef Ben Ali), died 1196. He is buried in a zawiya dedicated to him outside Bab Aghmat.
- Sidi Abu al-Abbas as-Sabti (also known as Sidi Bel Abbes), died 1204. He is buried at the Zawiya of Sidi Bel Abbes in the northernmost neighbourhood of the medina. His tomb was one of the earliest major zawiyas to be popular in Marrakesh, generations before Sufi zawiyas became more generally influential. He was even venerated by the Jewish inhabitants of the city.
- Sidi Ben Sliman al-Jazuli (also known as Sidi Ben Slimane or as al-Jazuli), died 1465. He was the only one of the seven saints who died outside Marrakesh and was initially buried elsewhere. His body was transferred from the village of Afoughal to Marrakesh by the Saadians in 1523–24. His tomb is found at the Zawiya of Sidi Ben Slimane, located south of the zawiya of Sidi Bel Abbes.
- Sidi Abd al-'Aziz at-Taba'a (also known as Sidi Abdelaziz), died 1508. He is buried in the Zawiya of Sidi Abd el-Aziz, north of the Mouassine Mosque and south of the zawiya of al-Jazuli.
- Sidi Abdallah al-Ghazwani (also known as al-Ghazwani or as Moulay Ksour), died 1528. He is buried in a zawiya just northwest of the Jemaa el-Fnaa.

=== Gallery ===
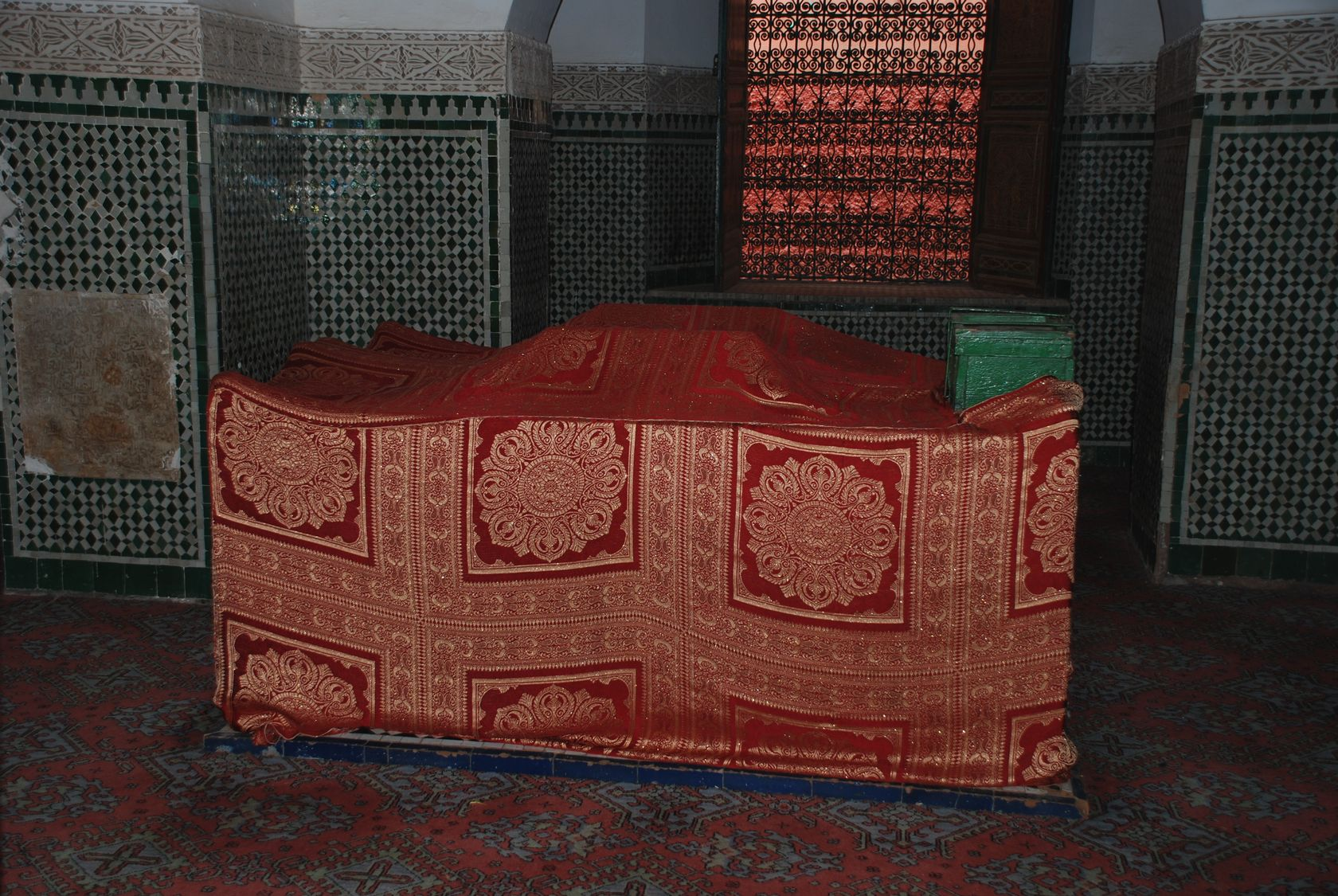
The tomb of Qadi 'Iyyad

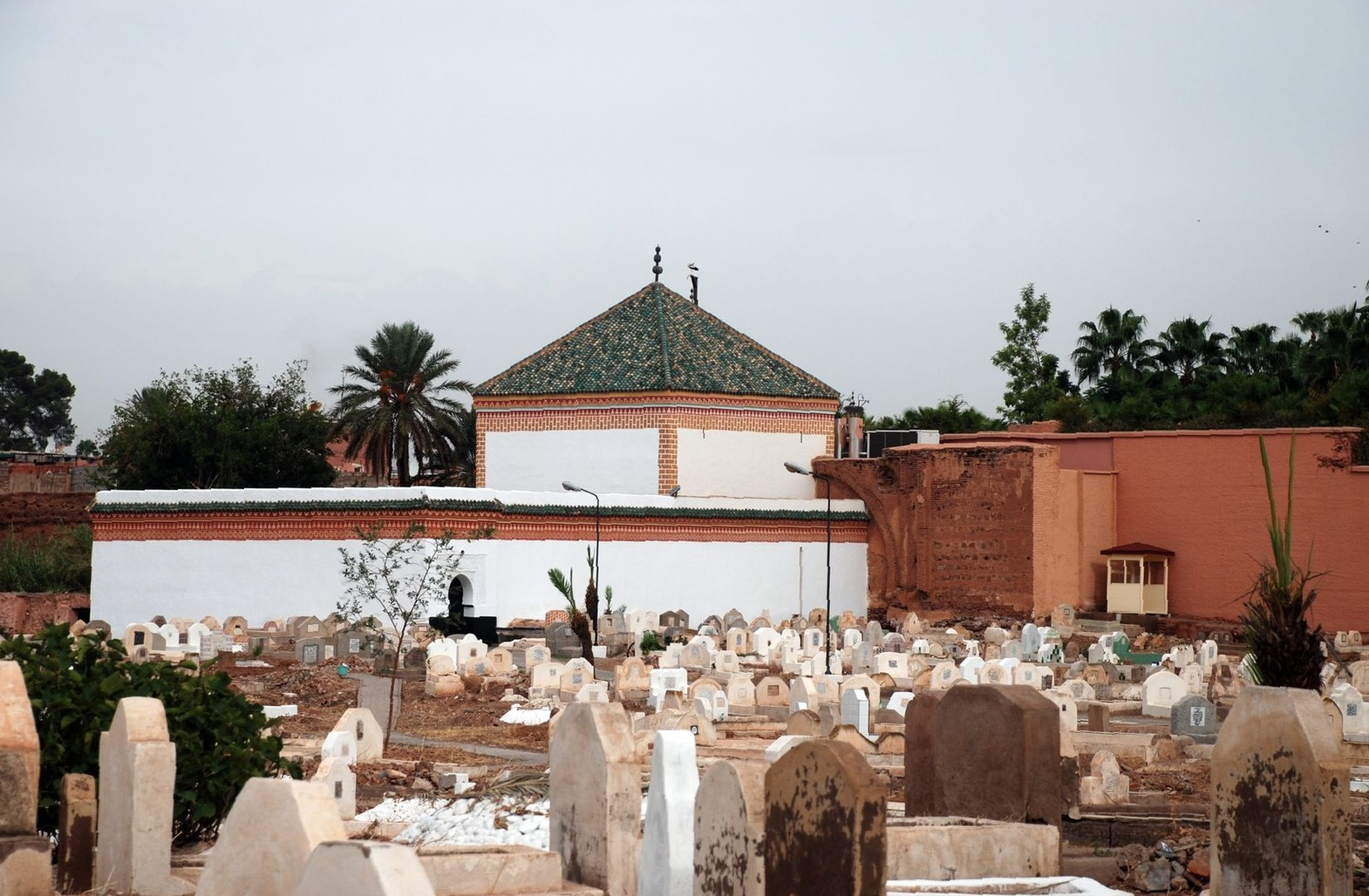
The mausoleum of al-Suhayli, located in a cemetery along the southwestern walls of the city, near Bab er-Robb

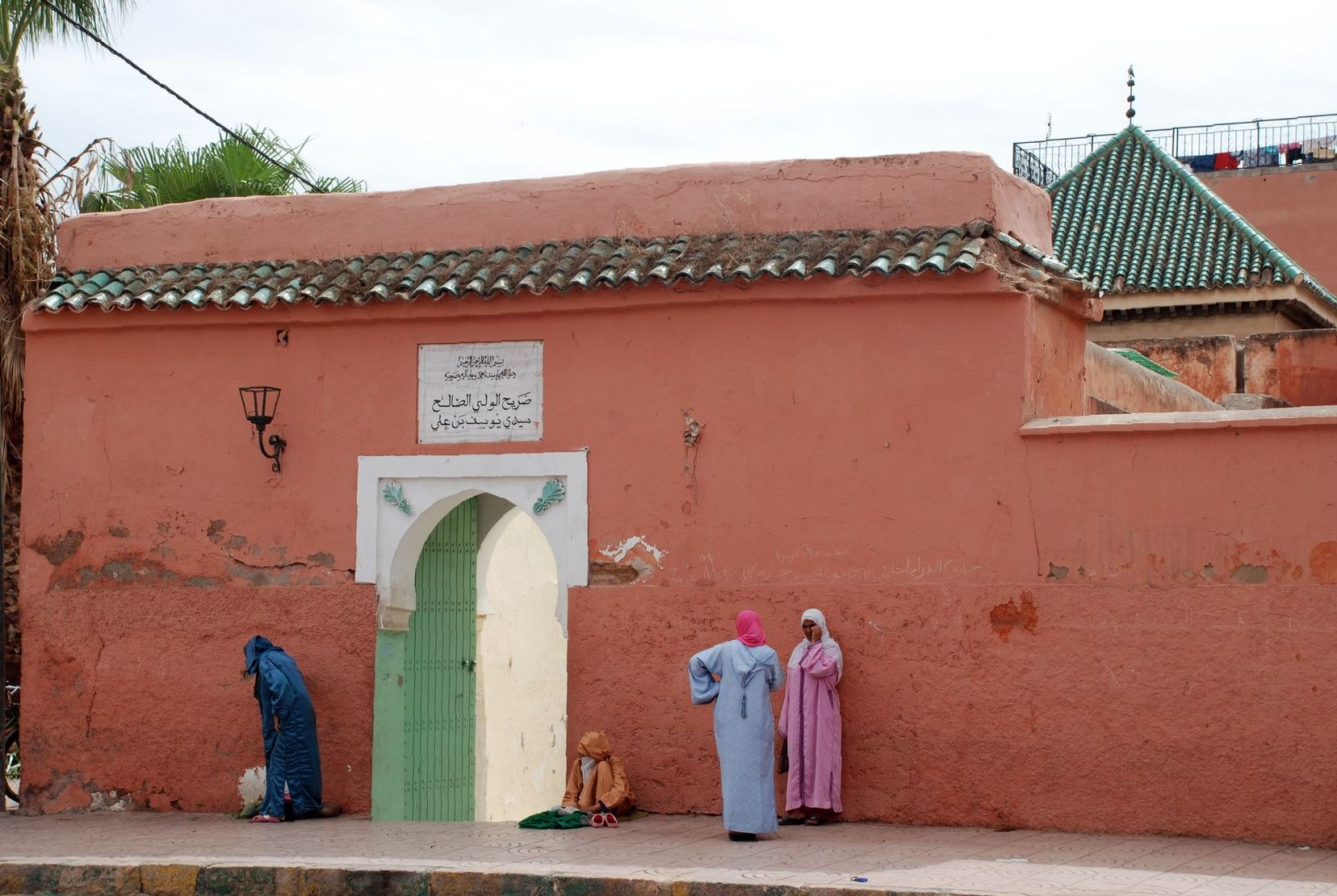
The Zawiya of Sidi Yusuf ibn Ali, near Bab Aghmat

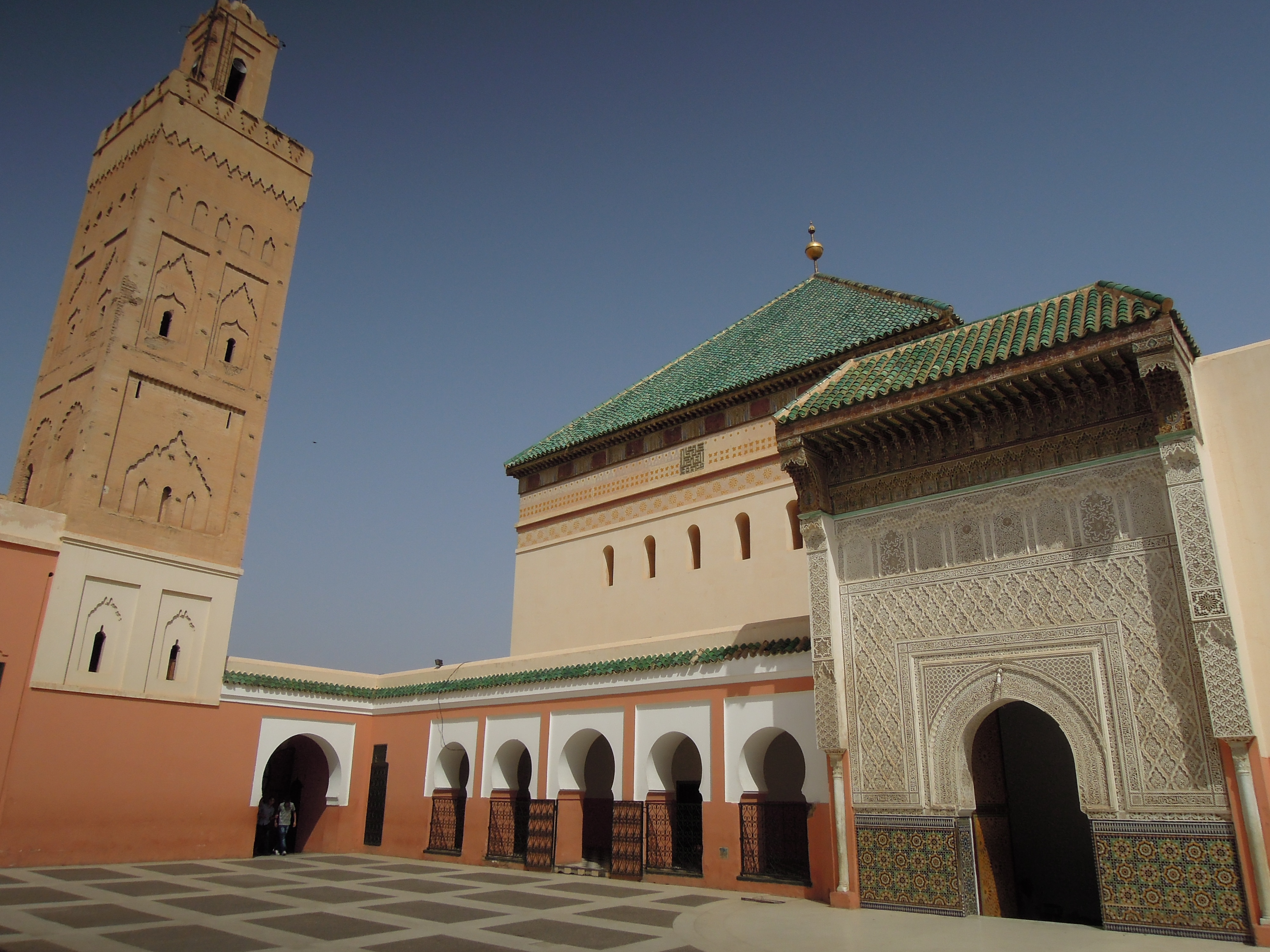
The central courtyard of the Zawiya of Sidi Bel Abbes. The mausoleum is on the right and the minaret of the complex stands on the left.

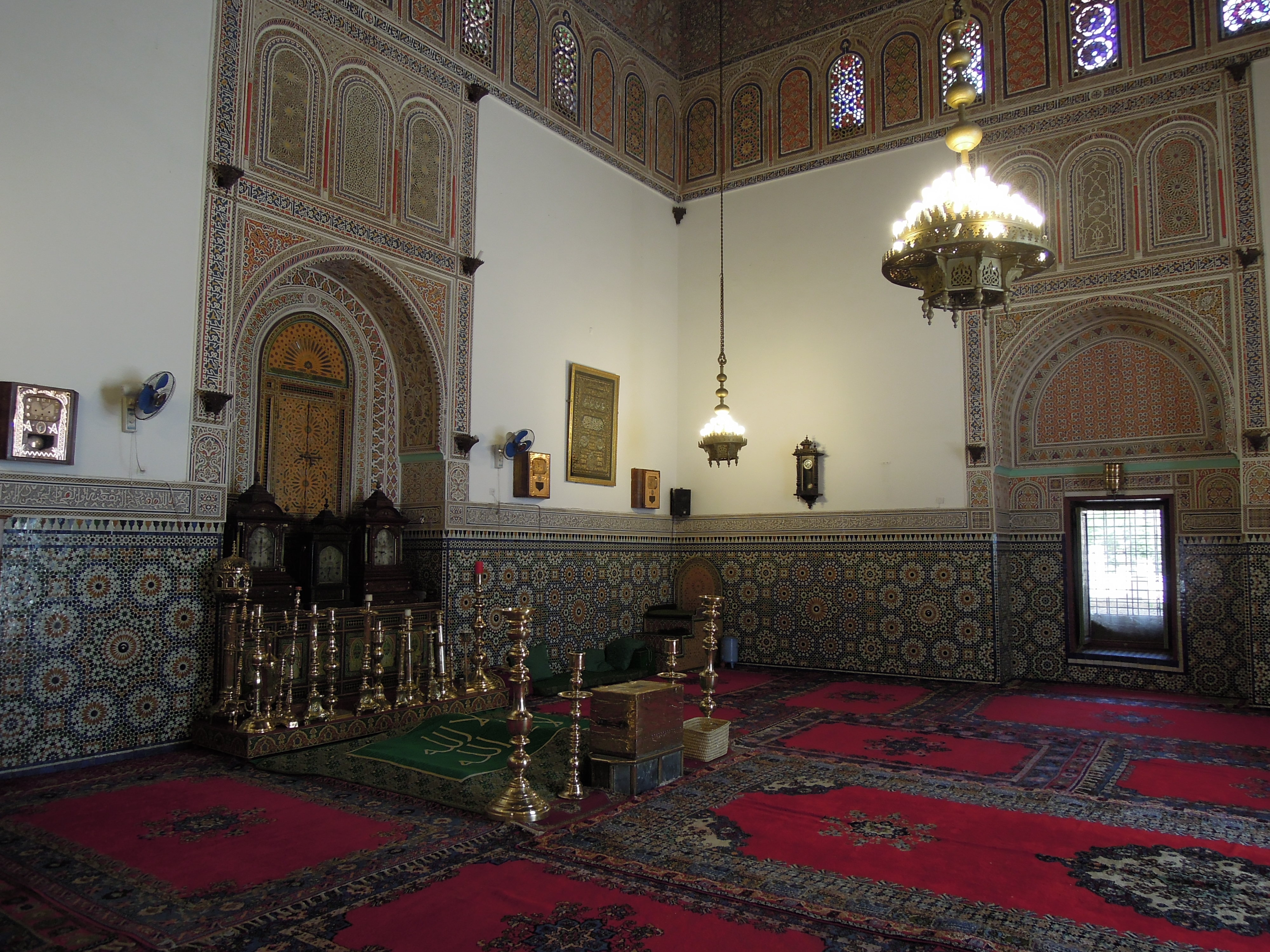
The mausoleum chamber of Sidi Bel Abbes

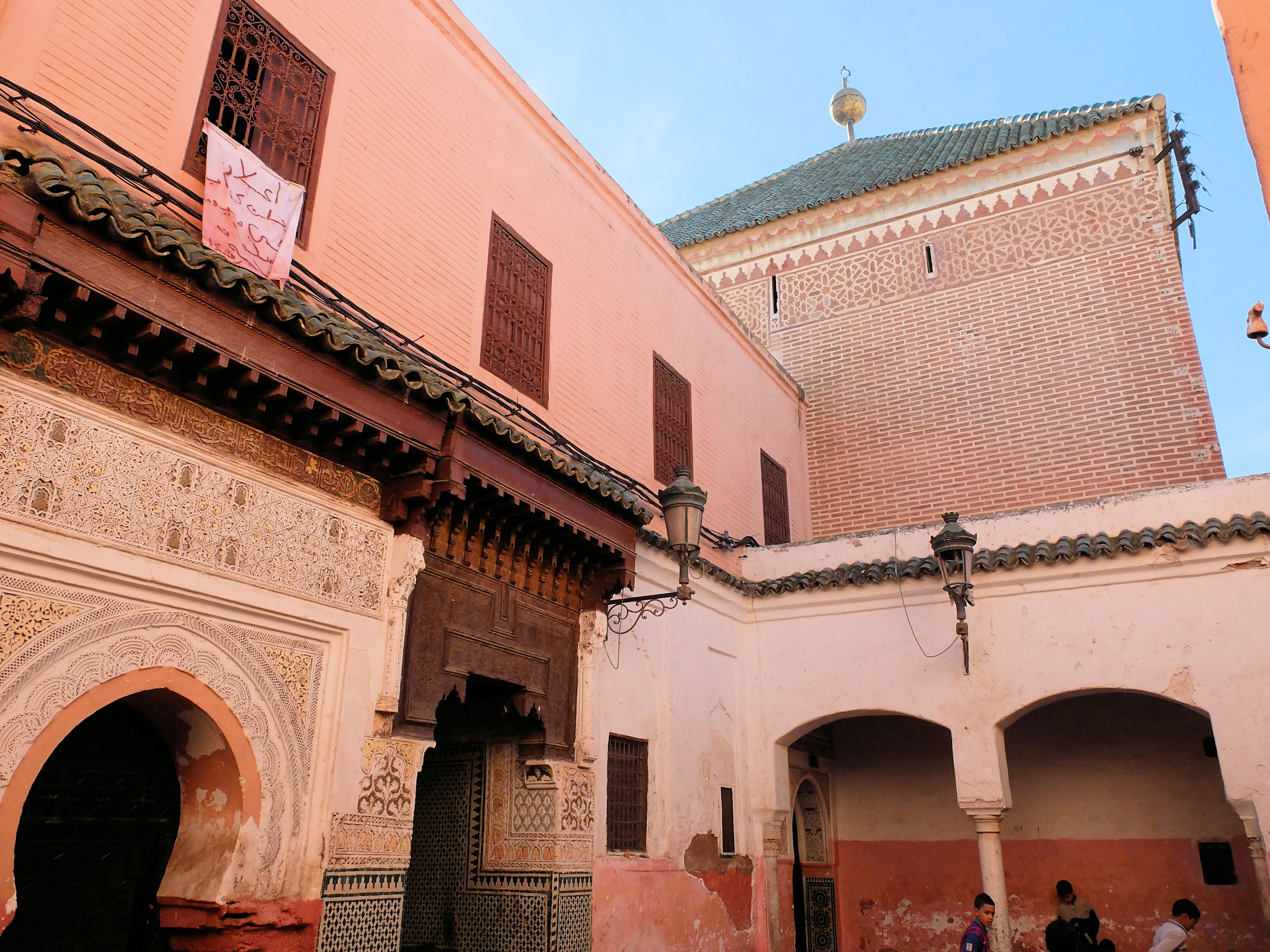
The mausoleum and Zawiya of Sidi Ben Sliman al-Jazuli

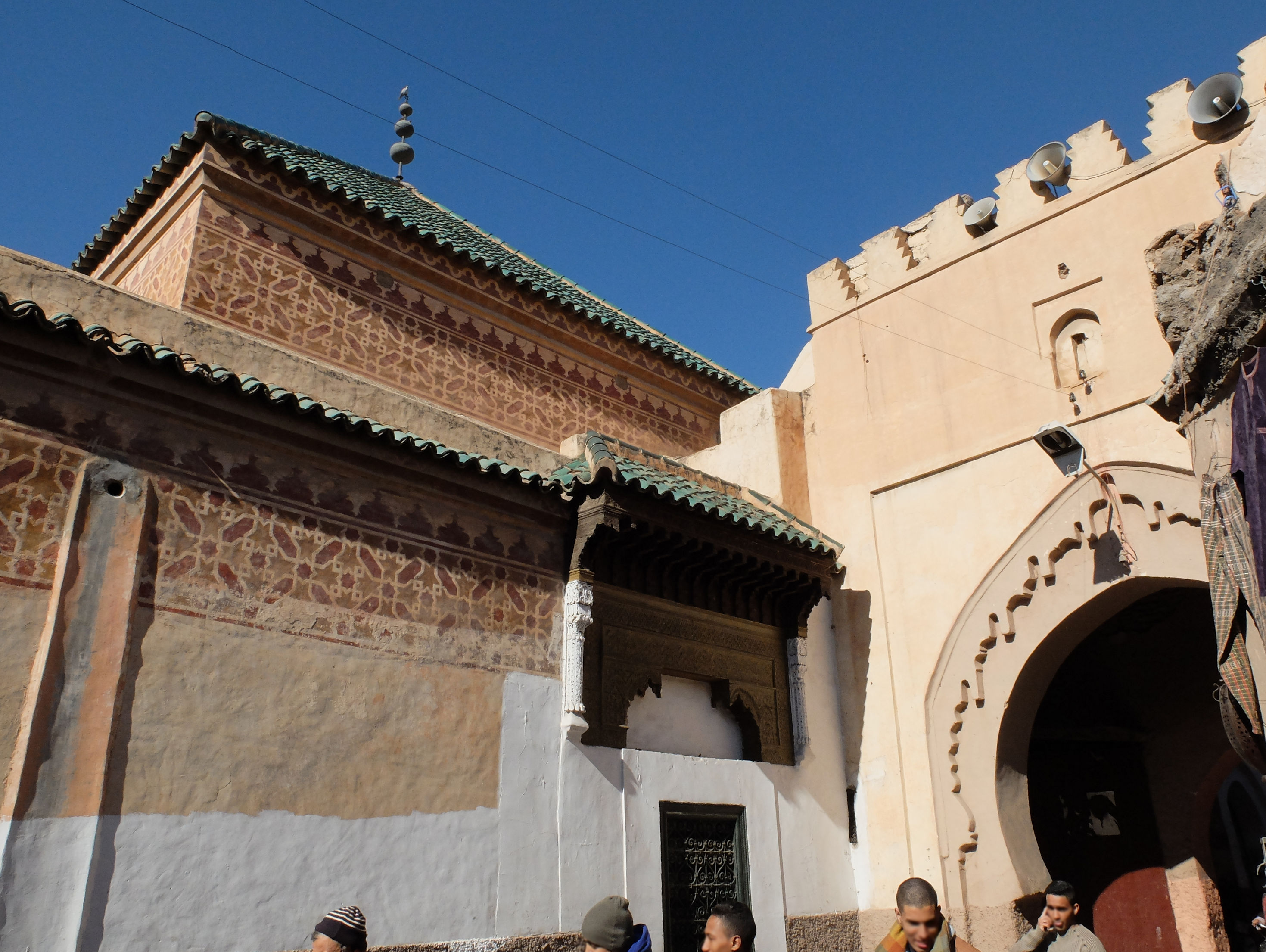
The mausoleum and Zawiya of Sidi Abd al-Aziz

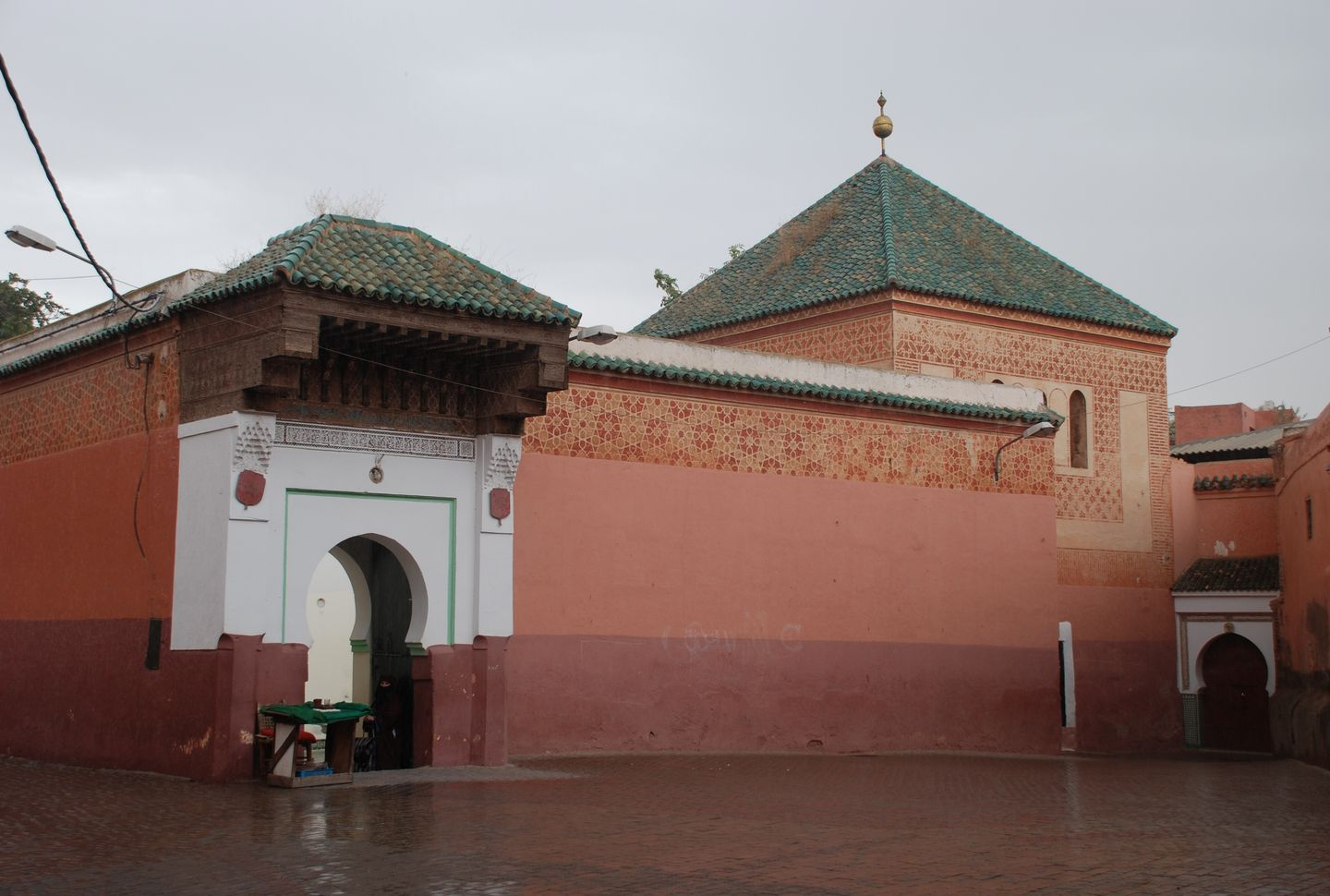
The mausoleum and zawiya of Sidi al-Ghazwani (or Moulay el-Ksour)

== See also ==
- Wali Sanga
- List of Sufi saints
- List of Sufis
