= Zawiya of Sidi Abd el-Aziz =

Religious building in Marrakesh, Morocco

Coordinates: 31°37′55.5″N 7°59′20.6″W

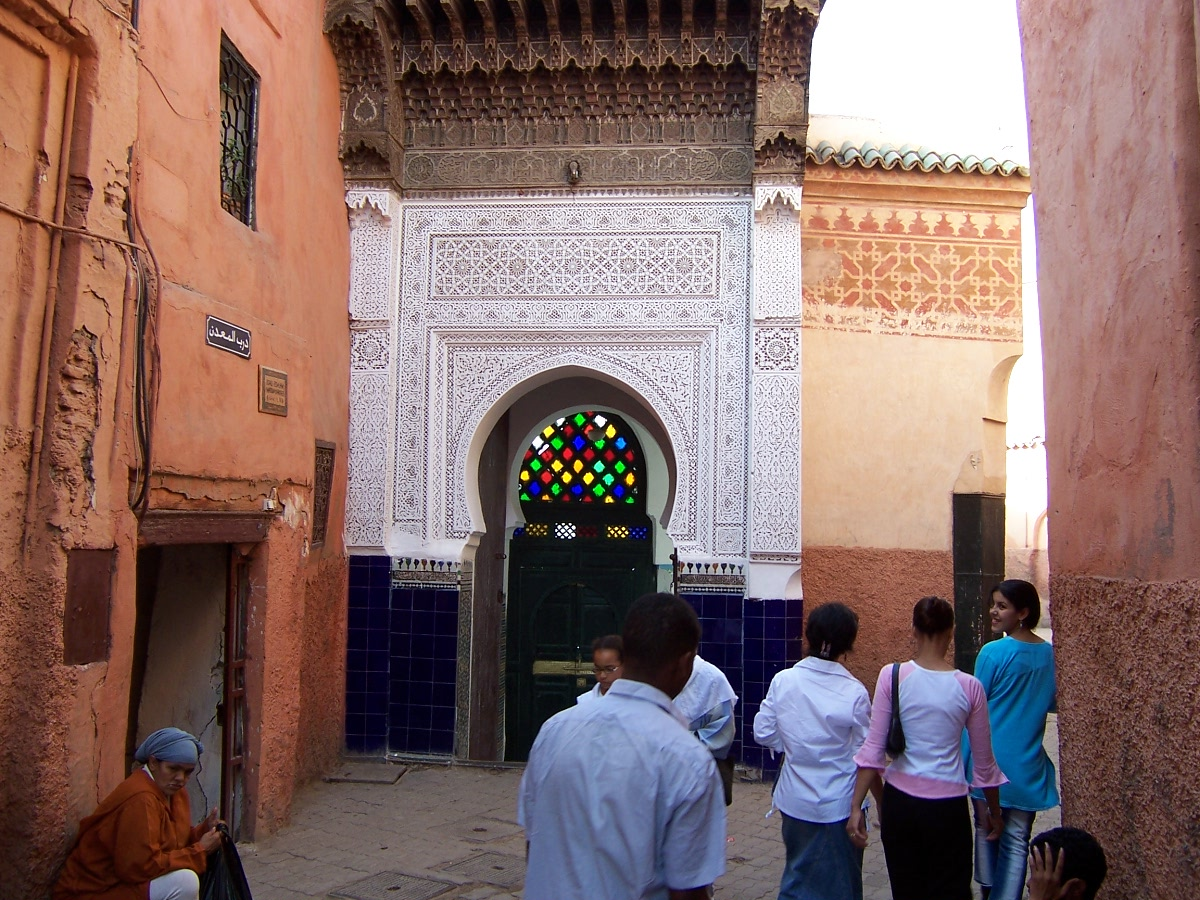
The entrance to the zawiya

The Zawiya of Sidi Abd el-Aziz (alternate spellings include Zaouia of Sidi Abdelaziz) is an Islamic religious complex (zawiya) in Marrakesh, Morocco. It is centered around the tomb of the Muslim scholar and Sufi saint Sidi Abu Faris Abd al-Aziz Abd al-Haq at-Tabba', who died in Marrakesh in 1508. Sidi Abd el-Aziz is considered one of the Seven Saints of Marrakesh, and his tomb was a prominent stop for pilgrims to Marrakesh. The zawiya is located on Rue Mouassine (Mouassine Street) at its intersection with Rue Amesfah.

== Historical background ==
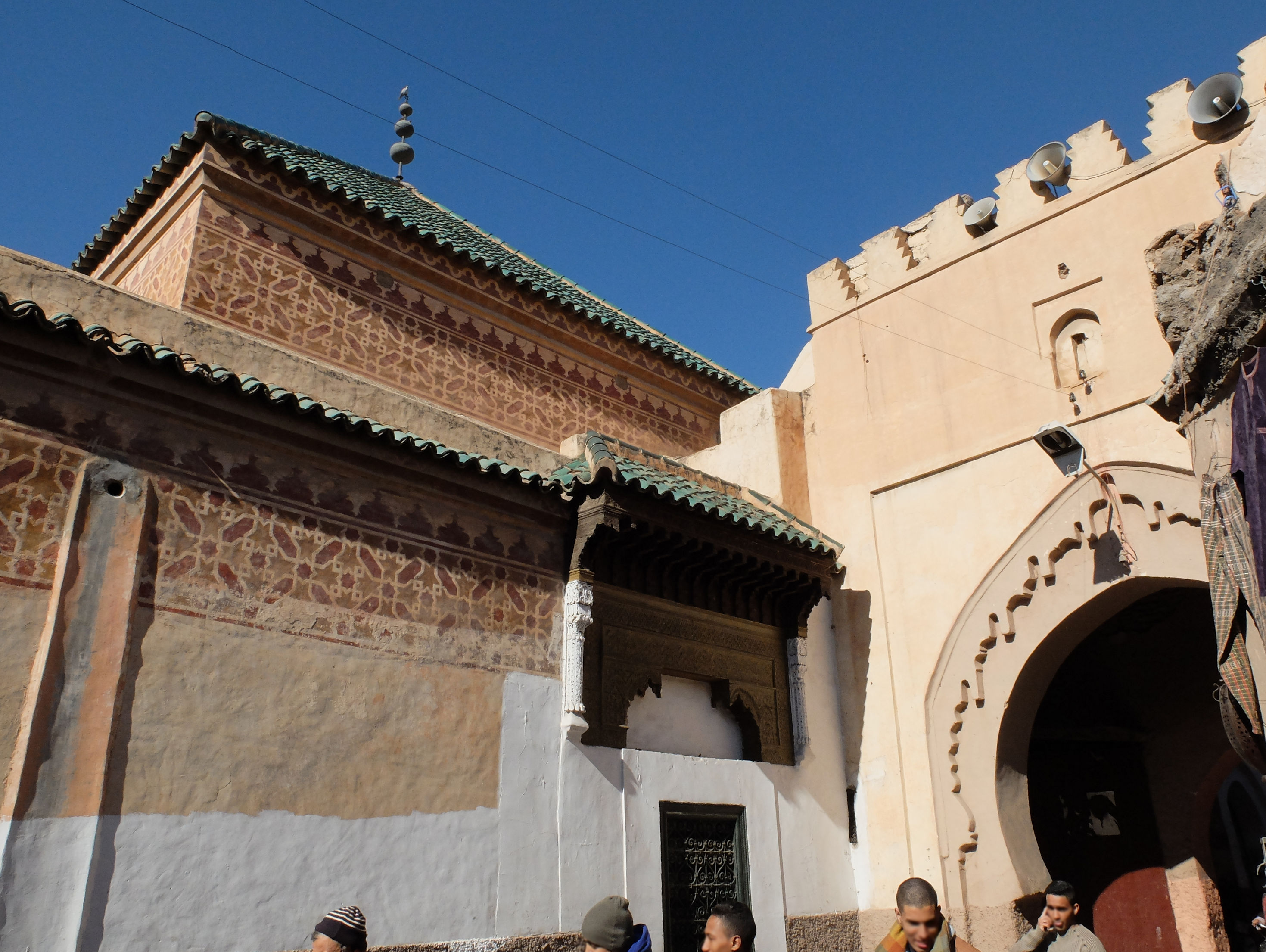
The eastern side of the zawiya, seen from the street; the pyramidal green roof denotes the mausoleum.

Sidi Abd al-Aziz at-Tabbaa' was the most important disciple of the Sufi master al-Jazuli, who died in 1465 and whose mausoleum is also found in Marrakesh (after his body was moved there by the Saadians in 1523-24). At-Tabba', a native of Marrakesh, gained his reputation while teaching at the al-'Attarine Madrasa in Fes and came to be seen as al-Jazuli's spiritual successor. Along with al-Jazuli and five others, he also came to be considered one of the Seven Saints of Marrakesh (a religious institution officially established by Sultan Moulay Ismai'l), and was considered the patron saint of the city's tanners in particular. Among these Seven Saints was also Sidi Abdallah al-Ghaswani who himself was a disciple and successor of Sidi Abdelaziz and was later buried in another zawiya further south.

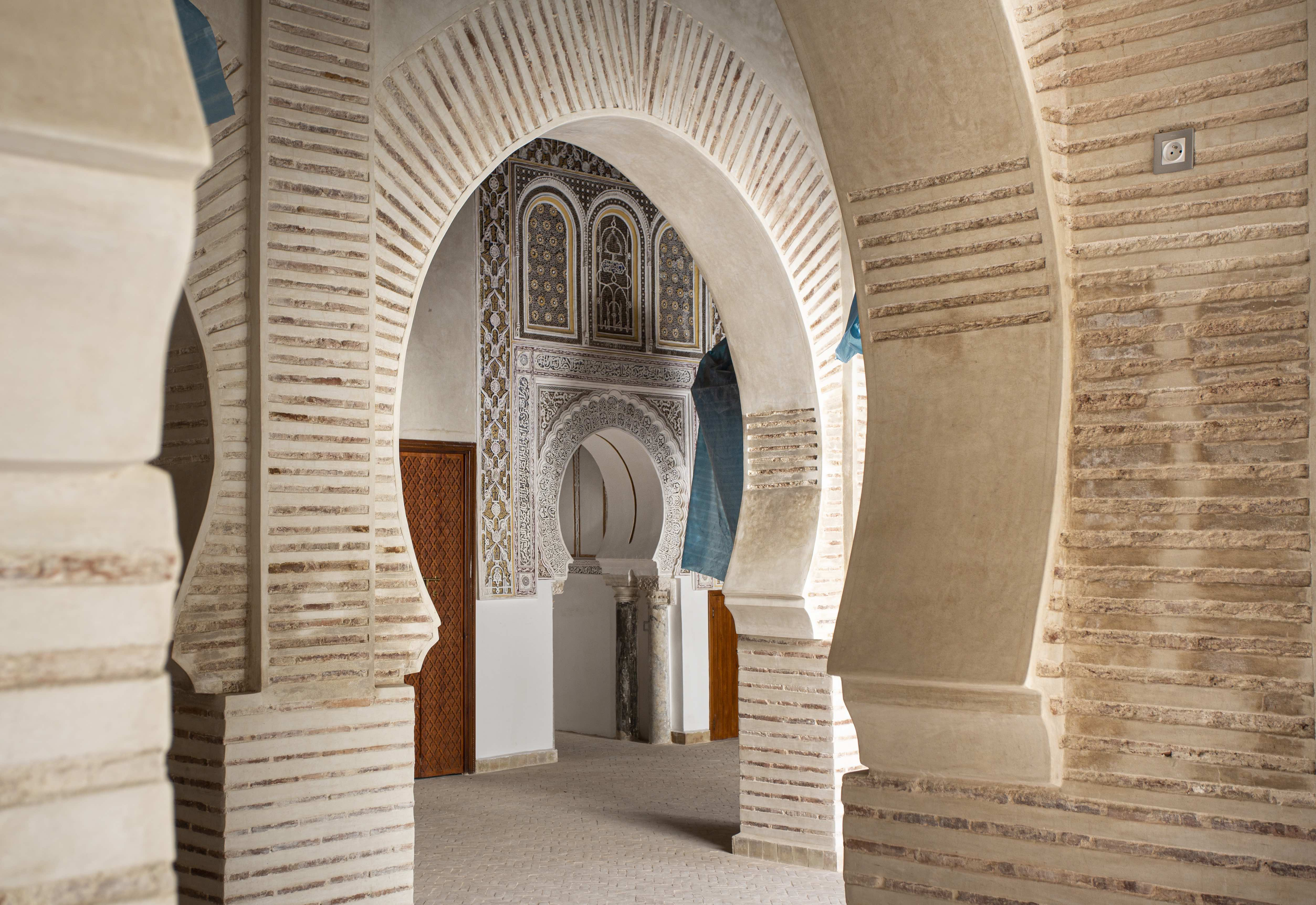
Interior of the zawiya's mosque or prayer hall, looking towards the mihrab

The zawiya complex presents a mix of Saadian and later Alaouite architecture. The mausoleum first took shape under the Saadians in the early 16th century. According to historian Gaston Deverdun, the current building dates largely from the time of Moulay Muhammad ibn Abdallah (governor of Marrakesh after 1746 and sultan from 1757-1790), who is responsible for building and restoring many monuments in the city.

== See also ==
- Zawiya of Muhammad Ben Sliman al-Jazuli
- Zawiya of Sidi Bel Abbes
