= Zawiya of Sidi Muhammad Ben Sliman al-Jazuli =

Religious building in Marrakesh, Morocco

- الزاوية الجزولية
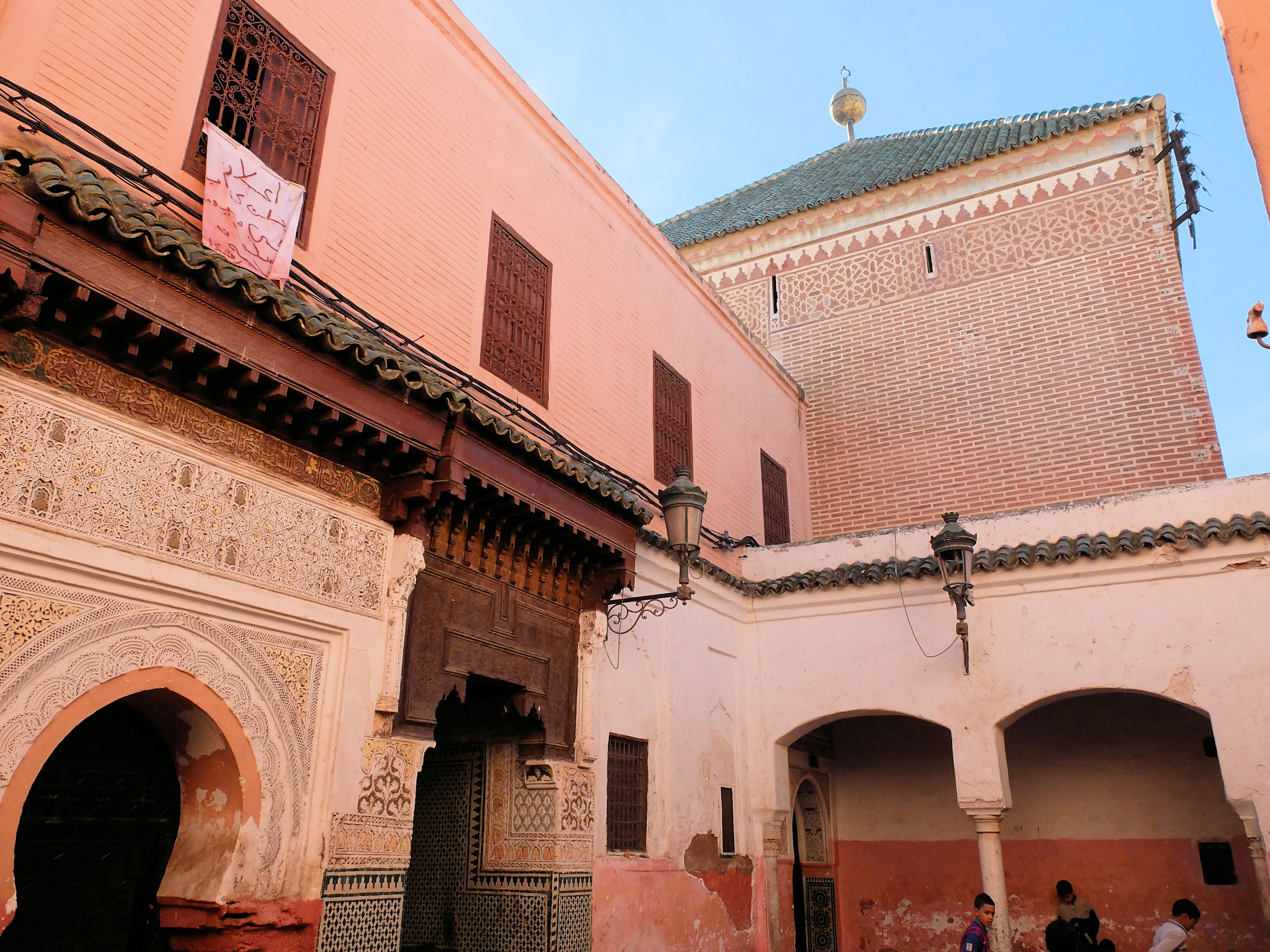
- The northern side of the zawiya. The mausoleum is on the right (green pyramidal roof).

Religion
- Affiliation: Islam
- Status: active

Location
- Location: Marrakesh, Morocco
- Interactive map of Zawiya of Sidi Muhammad Ben Sliman al-Jazuli
- Coordinates: 31°38′11.1″N 7°59′30.7″W

Architecture
- Type: Zawiya
- Style: Moorish (Saadian)
- Founder: Ahmad al-'Araj
- Established: 1523–4 CE

The Zawiya of Sidi Muhammad Ben Sliman al-Jazuli (Note: Also rendered as Zaouia of Sidi Ben Slimane al-Jazouli.) is a zawiya (Islamic Sufi religious complex) in Marrakesh, Morocco. It is centered around the tomb of Muhammad al-Jazuli, a 15th-century Muslim scholar and Sufi saint who is one of the Seven Saints of Marrakesh.

The complex was established around 1523–4, when the Saadian ruler Ahmad al-'Araj transferred al-Jazuli's body here. It was subsequently restored and modified in later periods. The complex consists mainly of a mosque and a mausoleum chamber, with other smaller elements including an ablutions facility, a street fountain, a hospice, a residence, and a school room. A small cemetery next to the complex contains the tombs of Ahmad al-'Araj and other members of his family.

== Historical background ==
Al-Jazuli was a major figure in the history of Moroccan Sufism. He lived at a time when local Sufi movements were also filling a void of political leadership against the encroachment of Portuguese and Spanish forces into the country. Originating from the Sous region in southern Morocco, he spent much time in Fes where he wrote his most famous work, the Dala'il al-Khayrat, and gained enormous influence over zawiyas and followers across the country. He subsequently moved around the coast of Morocco until he died near Essaouira in 1465 and was buried in the village of Afoughal.

Later on, the early Saadians, who were also from the Sous region, associated themselves with al-Jazuli's followers as they established their own political power in southern Morocco. Thus, when Ahmad al-'Araj (the effective founder of the Saadian dynasty) moved to Marrakesh in 1521 he quickly arranged for the transfer of al-Jazuli's body here, probably in 1523–4, (Note: Historian Gaston Deverdun notes that, depending on which numbers in the historical sources are used to calculate this date, the transfer could have occurred in a range of years after this. He concludes that the date indicated by the historical author al-Ifrani,1523–4, is the most likely.) along with that of his own father (who had been buried near al-Jazuli in 1517). The Saadians built a religious complex and mosque around the new mausoleum.

After the reign of Muhammad al-Sheikh (Ahmad's brother, who had managed to dethrone him), the dynasty distanced itself from al-Jazuli's disciples. Nonetheless, al-Jazuli came to be considered one of the Seven Saints of Marrakesh and his tomb was a prominent stop for pilgrims to the city. While the mosque of the complex may still date from the Saadian period, the rest of the zawiya was frequently modified and restored over the years, particularly in the 18th century. The Alaouite sultan Moulay Isma'il was responsible for building the current mausoleum chamber with its large pyramidal cupola as well as for expanding the attached mosque and converting it to a Friday mosque. The street fountain of the complex also dates from this period. The zawiya was significantly restored or modified under Moulay Muhammad ibn Abdallah (who was made governor of Marrakesh in 1746 and ruled as sultan from 1757 to 1790) and was repaired in 1867-68 under Moulay Muhammad ibn Abd al-Rahman.

== Architecture and layout ==
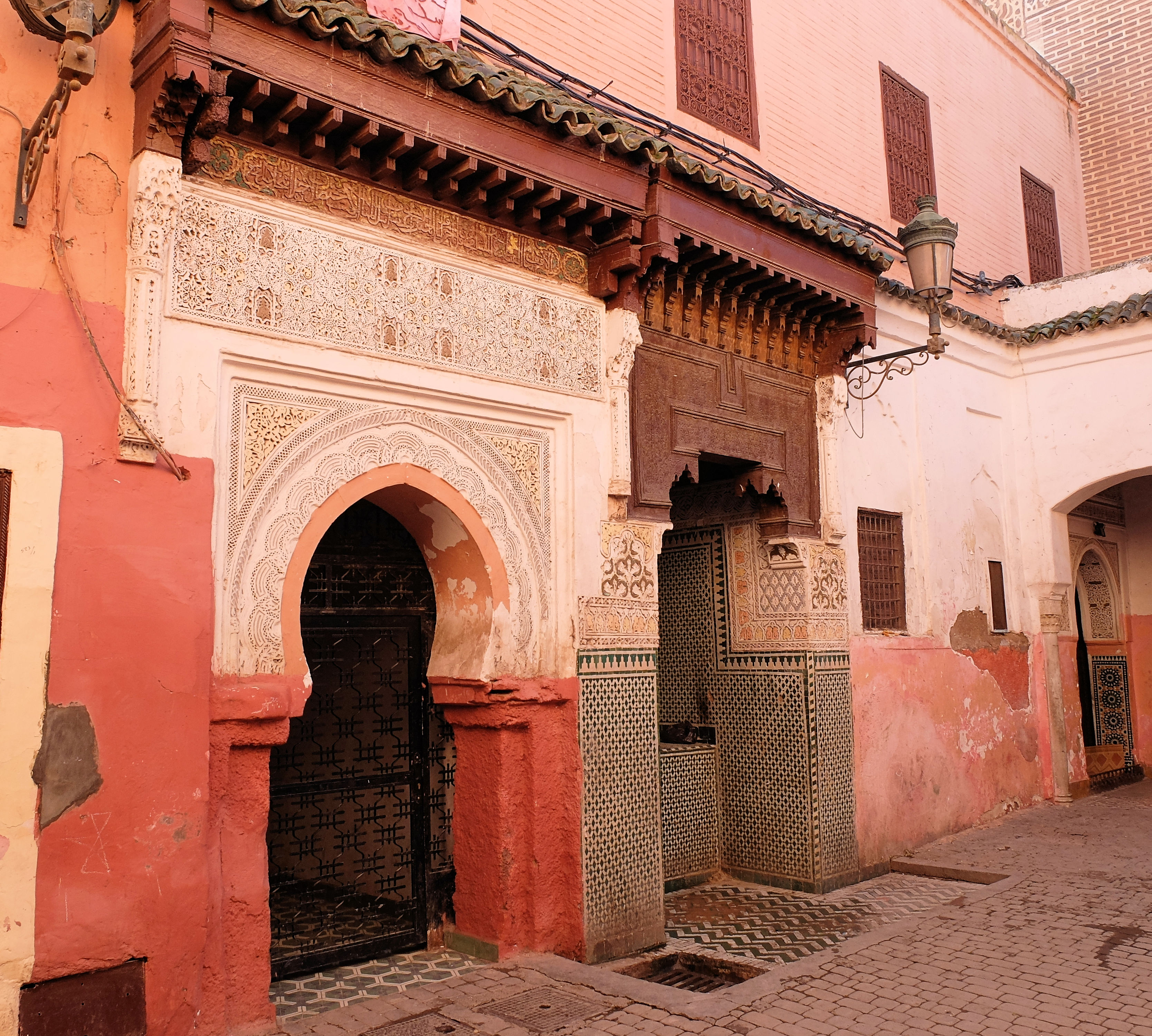
One of the main entrances (left) of the zawiya and, next to it (right), the zawiya's street fountain. The decoration includes carved stucco, a carved wooden canopy, and zellij tilework.

=== The mosque and mausoleum complex ===
The zawiya is a complex of structures and facilities which provide for a number of services and functions. Their architecture is similar to that of other Saadian religious complexes in the late 16th century such as the Mouassine Mosque and Bab Doukkala Mosque, as well as the later Zawiya of Sidi Bel Abbes. The center of the complex is occupied by a mosque with a rectangular floor plan consisting of a nearly square courtyard (sahn) and an interior prayer hall divided into five naves by rows of arches. The interior of the mosque is not heavily decorated. North of the sahn is another courtyard which leads to the mausoleum chamber of al-Jazuli: a large square chamber higher than the surrounding structures and covered by a wood-frame cupola and, from the exterior, a pyramidal roof with green tiles, visible from the street and typical of Moroccan royal and religious structures. Immediately on the east side of the mausoleum are two of the zawiya's main entrances, alongside a decorated street fountain. Behind these is a small chamber which served as a madrasa or school. The rest of the complex, on its eastern side, is occupied by the house of the muqaddam, a hospice for pilgrims, and a large midha (ablutions house) with a central water basin and 14 latrines.

=== The cemetery and the Saadian mausoleum ===
The establishment of the zawiya also led to the development of a small cemetery along its western flank (separate from al-Jazuli's actual mausoleum chamber) which also served as the very first burial site of the Saadian dynasty in Marrakesh (before the later Saadian Tombs in the Kasbah). Soon after Muhammad al-Sheikh was assassinated by the Ottomans in 1557, Ahmad al-'Araj (his brother) was put to death, along with all his possible male heirs, allowing Moulay Abdallah al-Ghalib to accede to power unchallenged. After a time, Ahmad and his sons were buried near al-Jazuli's mausoleum on the initiative of the local scholar Abu 'Amru al-Qastali al-Murrakshi. According to his tombstone's inscription, his daughter 'Aysha was responsible for erecting the domed mausoleum, known as the Qubūr al-Ashraf, over his tomb. His tombstone, carved in black marble, disappeared sometime after 1946. Another tombstone within the mausoleum is believed to be for Ahmad's father, Muhammad Ibn 'Abd al-Rahman (also known as al-Qa'im bi-'Amrillah), though this is not confirmed by any inscription. The mausoleum structure is a simple chamber made in brick with a dome on an octagonal base. Inside, the upper walls of the chamber are decorated with arabesque and epigraphic motifs carved in plaster.

== See also ==
- Zawiya of Sidi Abd el-Aziz
