= Zawiya of Sidi Bel Abbes =

Religious building in Marrakesh, Morocco

Zawiya of Sidi Abu al-Abbas al-Sabti
- زاوية سيدي بلعباس
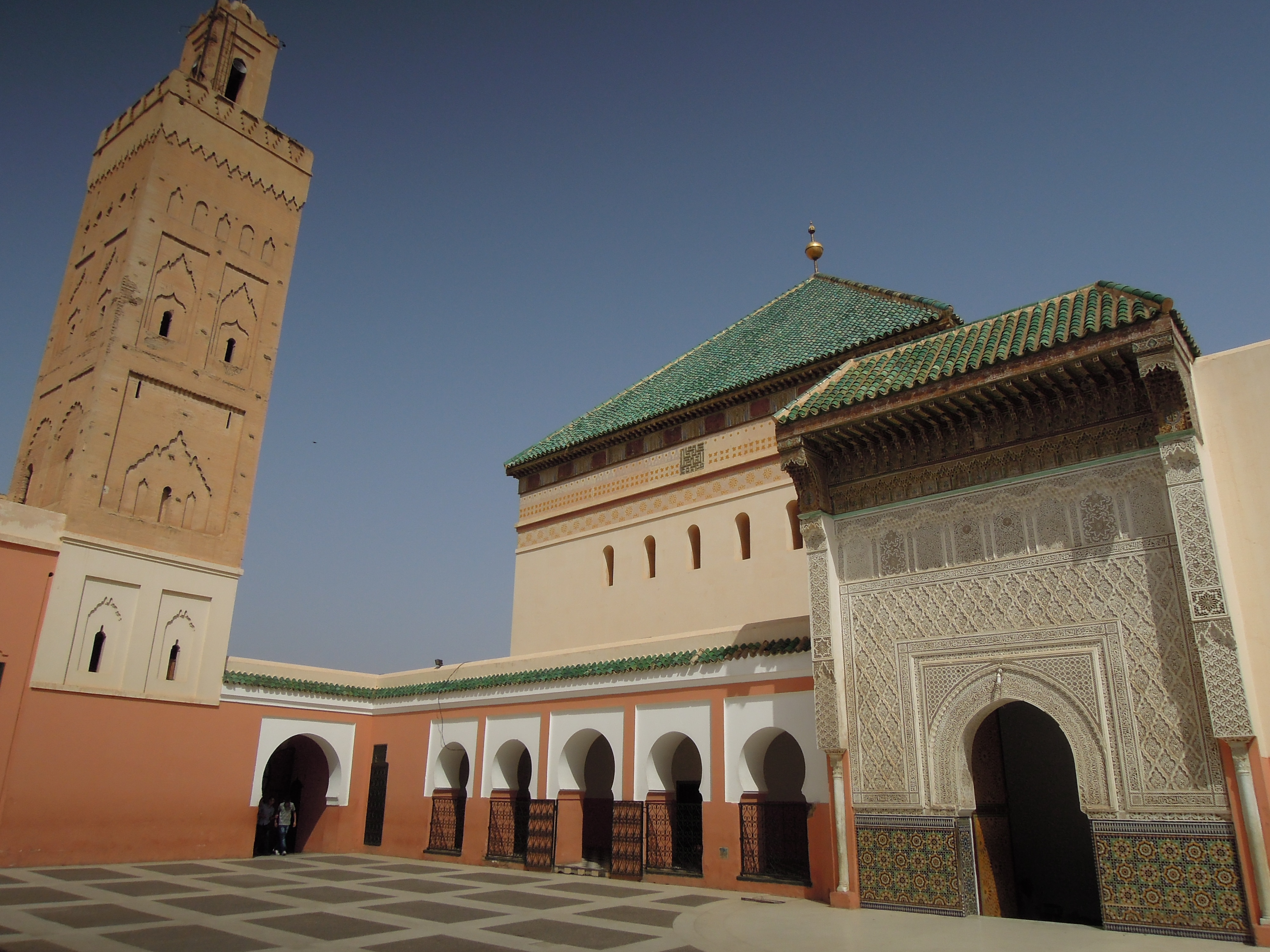
- Main courtyard of the complex, with mausoleum on the right and minaret on the left

Religion
- Affiliation: Islam
- Status: active

Location
- Location: Marrakesh, Morocco
- Interactive map of Zawiya of Sidi Abu al-Abbas al-Sabti
- Coordinates: 31°38′20.1″N 7°59′27.9″W

Architecture
- Type: Zawiya
- Style: Moorish (Saadian, Alawi)
- Completed: c. 1605 (original); 1720 (mausoleum rebuilt); 1756 (restoration, madrasa built); 1870 (fountain built)

The Zawiya of Sidi Bel Abbes (Arabic: زاوية سيدي بلعباس) (Note: Also rendered as Zaouia of Sidi bel Abbès. or Zawiya of Sidi bel 'Abbas, among other variations.) is a zawiya (Islamic Sufi religious complex) in Marrakesh, Morocco. The complex is centered around the mausoleum of Abu al-Abbas al-Sabti (or Sidi Bel Abbes), a Sufi teacher who died in 1204. He is the most venerated of the Seven Saints of Marrakesh, generally considered the "patron saint" of the city.

The zawiya's architecture dates in part to the late Saadian period (early 17th century) but has been modified and restored multiple times during the Alawi period from the late 17th to 19th centuries. The complex includes many buildings of various functions arranged around two courtyards or plazas. The most important elements include the saint's mausoleum and a mosque, along with a madrasa, an asylum/hospice, and other facilities.

== History ==
=== Background: Abu al-Abbas al-Sabti ===
Abu al-Abbas al-Sabti (full name: Sidi Ahmed ibn Dja'far al-Khazraji Abu al-Abbas as-Sabti) was born in Ceuta in 1129 or 1130. He studied under Abu Abd Allah al-Fakhkhar, who was in turn a student of Qadi Ayyad (another of the seven saints buried in Marrakesh). In 1146, he moved to Marrakesh during the final weeks of the Almohad siege of the city and established himself there after its capture, mainly staying on the hill of Jbel Gilliz (or Gueliz). During this time, he received some financial support from the Almohad regime. Abu al-Abbas's doctrine was relatively simple, placing great emphasis on charity (zakat and sadaqah), inciting the rich to give to the poor. He was distinguished by his generosity, which in turn gained him considerable popularity.

When he died in 1204 he was buried in an unmarked grave in the former Cemetery of Sidi Marwan, near Bab Taghzout (the northern gate of the city at the time). Over time, he acquired a reputation for having performed miracles and he became the most important patron saint of Marrakesh, as well as more specifically the patron saint of commerce. His barakah (blessing) was also said to aid or cure illnesses, and especially to assist the blind; a reputation which has more or less remained to the present day.

=== The Zawiya ===
Some time after al-Sabti's death, a mausoleum was built over the tomb and it became the site of a popular pilgrimage. A mausoleum over his tomb existed since at least the 14th century. However, the current complex around his tomb was first built by the Saadian sultan Abu Faris Abdallah (r. 1603–1608) around 1605. Abu Faris built the mosque and the minaret, as well as madrasa and library. He was reportedly motivated to do this because he suffered from severe epilepsy (which was attributed to djinns) and hoped that by patronizing the tomb of Sidi Bel Abbes he could receive blessings that would cure him.

The zawiya was originally located outside the city walls, near the former northern gate of Bab Taghzout, but his zawiya attracted more and more settlers to the area until a flourishing neighbourhood developed here outside the walls of the city. In the late 17th century, Abu al-Abbas was chosen as one of the "Seven Saints" of Marrakesh and his tomb became one of the stops in an associated ziyara (pilgrimage) established on the initiative of the Alawi sultan Moulay Isma'il (ruled 1672–1727). Moulay Isma'il also rebuilt a new mausoleum chamber over the tomb in 1720. In the 18th century, under the reign of the Alawi sultan Muhammad ibn Abdallah, the walls of the city were finally extended to encompass the zawiya and its neighbourhood, forming the new northern point of the city. Muhammad ibn Abdallah also renovated the mausoleum and its mosque in 1756, and rebuilt its madrasa. The complex was expanded again in the 19th century. In 1850, during the reign of Abd al-Rahman, a long linear qaysariyya (market) specialized in passementerie was added along the street leading to the southern entrance of the zawiya, while in 1870 (during the reign of Muhammad IV) an elaborate fountain was added in the courtyard facing the mausoleum's entrance. The complex was renovated again in 1988 on the order of King Hassan II.

== Architecture ==
=== Overall layout ===
The zawiya is located directly north of the former city gate of Bab Taghzout. The architectural complex of the zawiya includes multiple buildings serving different functions, dating from different periods. Most of the structures are arranged around two large open-air courtyards which are connected to each other: one to the northwest and one to the southeast. The complex has several entrances but the main southern entrance (facing Bab Taghzout and the center of the city) is approached via a long linear qaysariyya (a type of bazaar or souq) consisting of a street flanked by rows of shops on either side, created in the 19th century. This leads to a small triangular courtyard at its northern end, which funnels into another long rectangular courtyard or alley, which in turn leads to the southeastern main courtyard of the complex. This quadrilateral courtyard is surrounded on all sides by rows of small rooms with arched entrances opening directly off the courtyard. It is also flanked to the west by the mosque of the complex, while on its northern side is the mausoleum building. Opposite the mausoleum entrance, in the middle of the southern side, is a tall ornate wall fountain dating from the 19th century. From the northwestern corner of this courtyard is an entrance leading to the next main courtyard of the complex, which is larger and slightly more irregular. This courtyard is again flanked by the mosque on its south side and by the mausoleum on its east side, but several other structures are also located around it which are part of the complex. The courtyard's northeast corner is occupied by an abattoir (part of the complex's services in providing food), its northern edge is occupied by residential structures, and its western side is flanked by a complex of structures including a set of latrines and an asylum for the blind. To the southwest of the second main courtyard and west of the mosque building is a rectangular structure, the madrasa, and further west of this, on the other side of another north-west street, is a hammam (bathhouse).

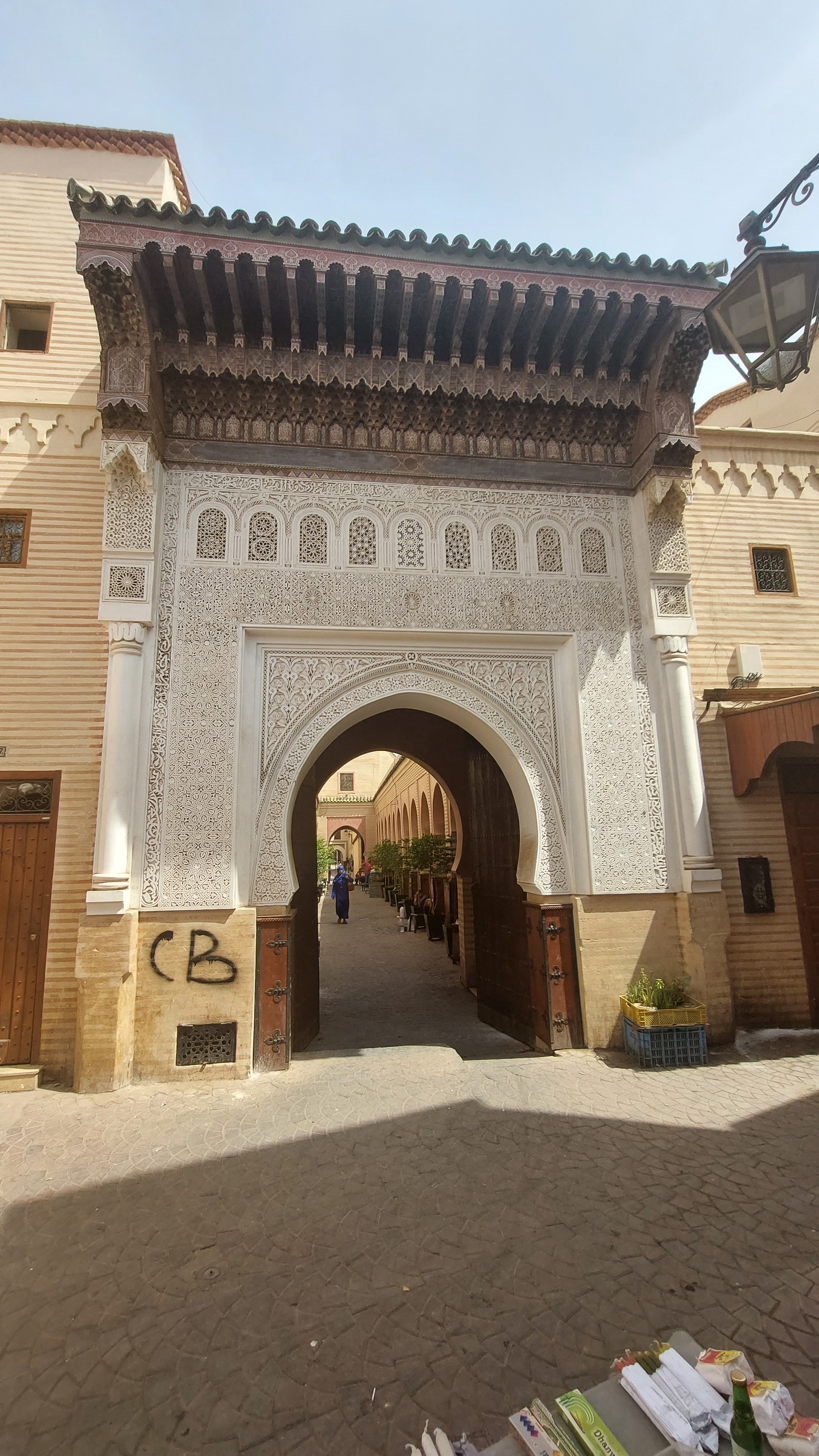
Entrance to the bazaar street on the south side of the complex

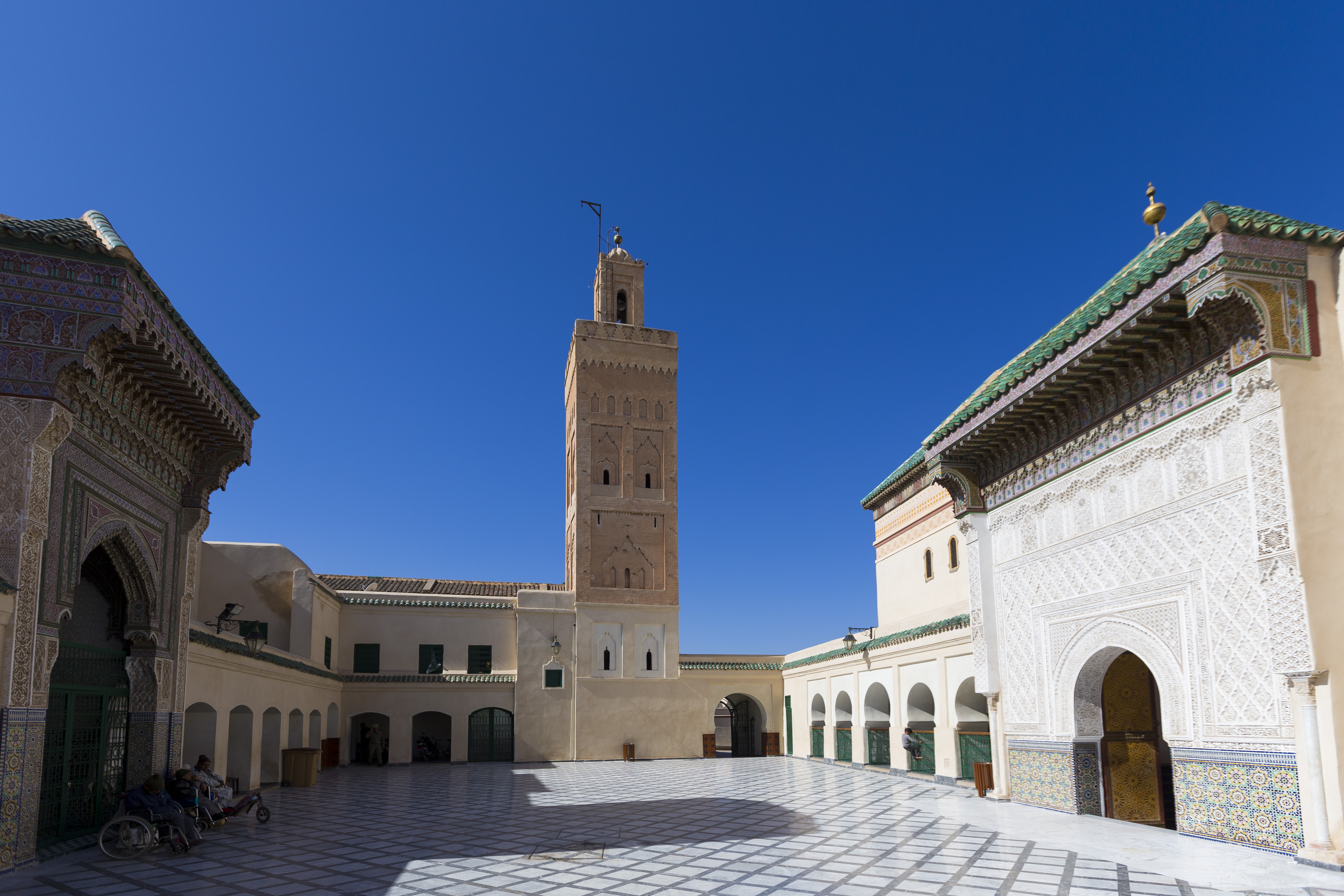
The main southeast courtyard of the complex

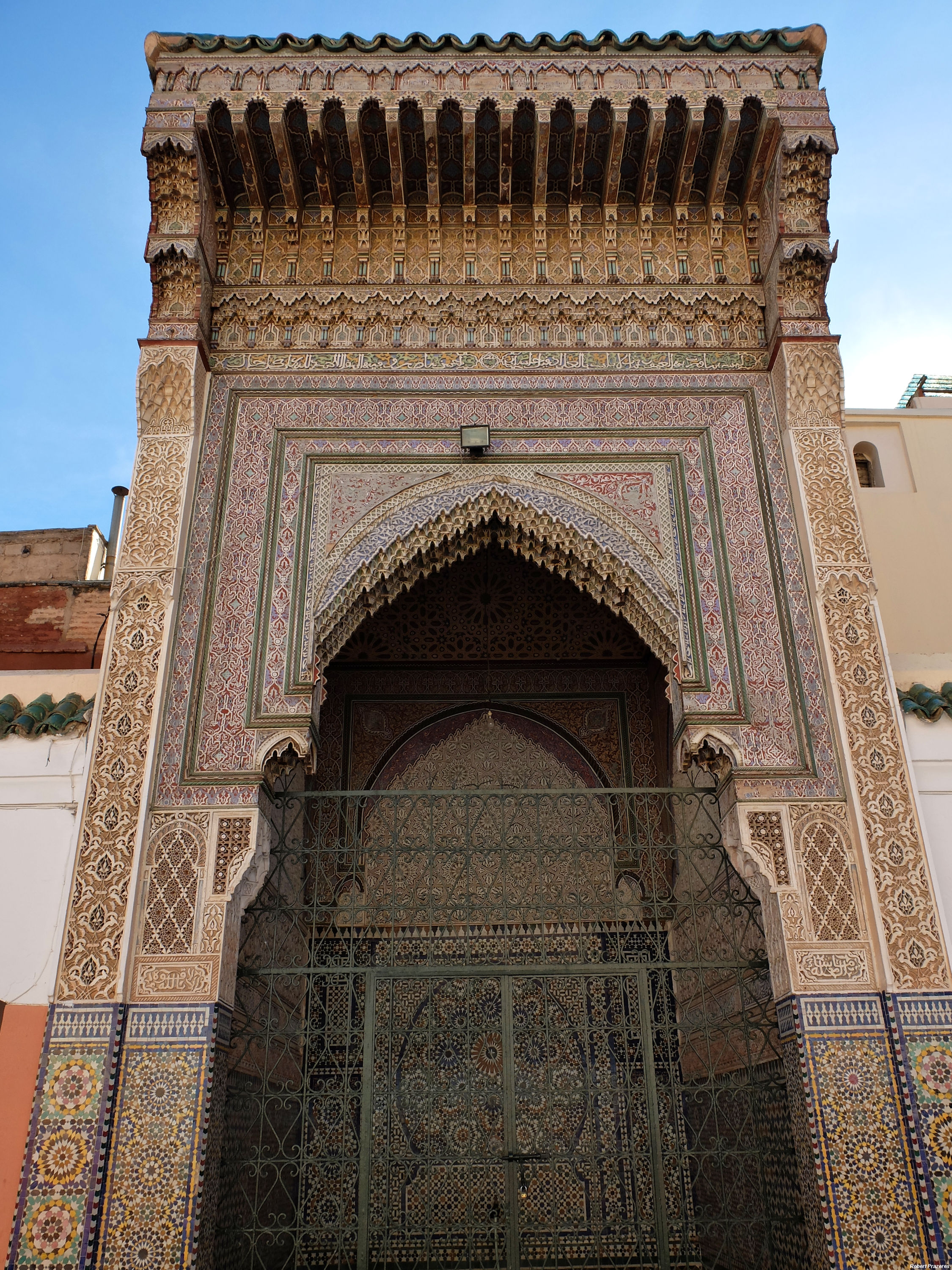
The monumental ornate wall fountain in the southeast courtyard

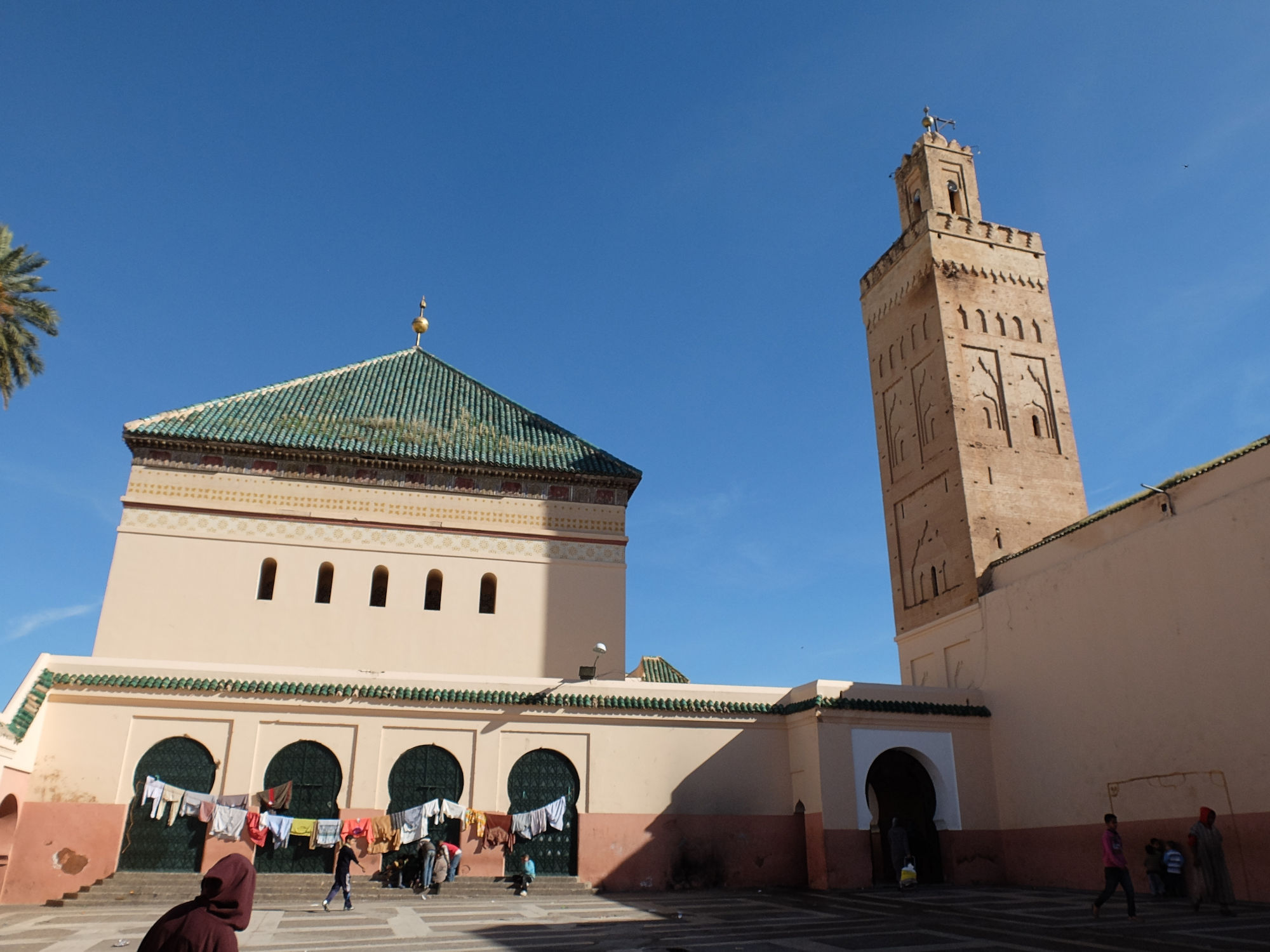
The main northwest courtyard of the complex

=== The mosque ===
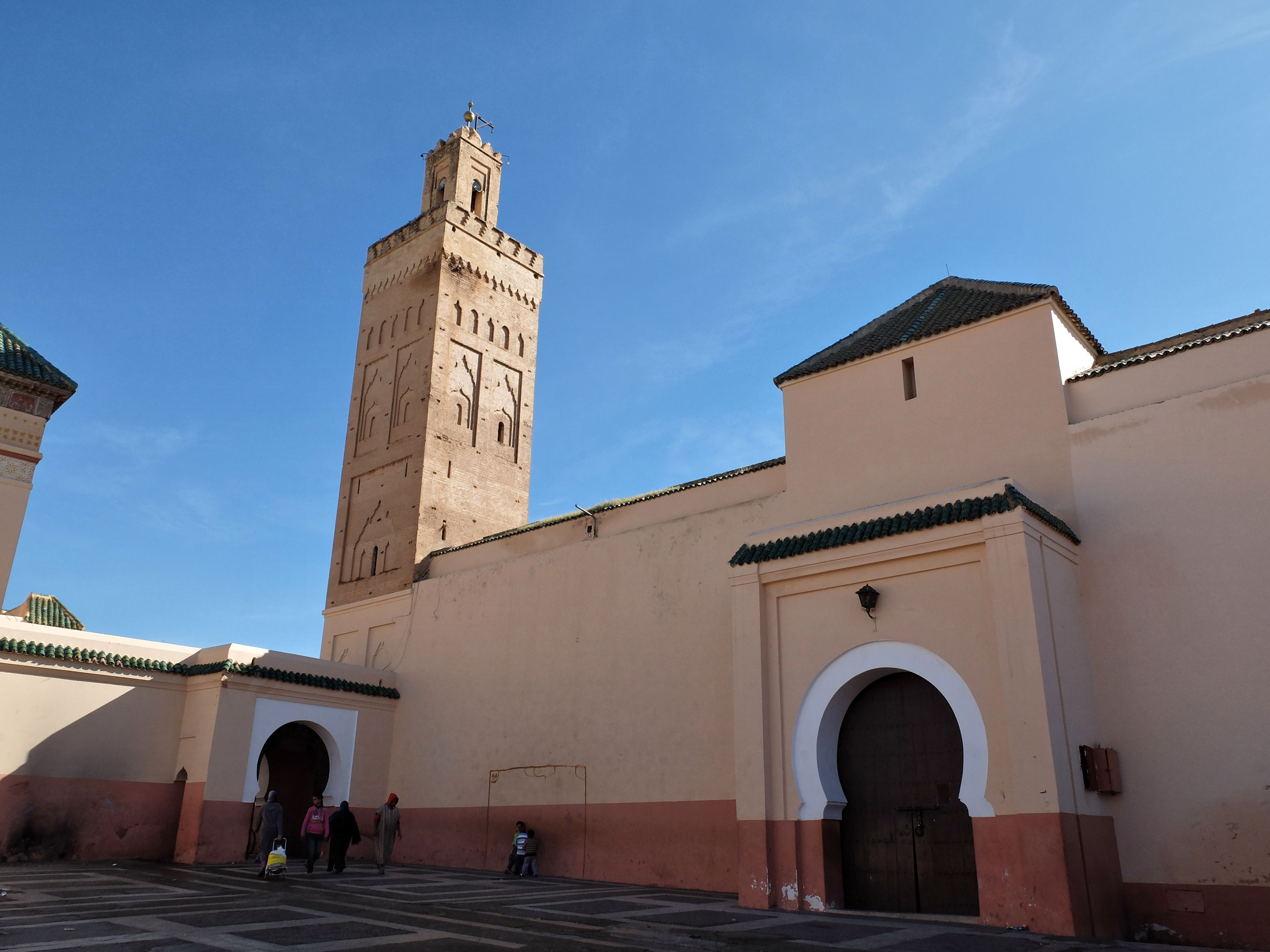
Exterior of the mosque, seen from the north, with entrance on the right

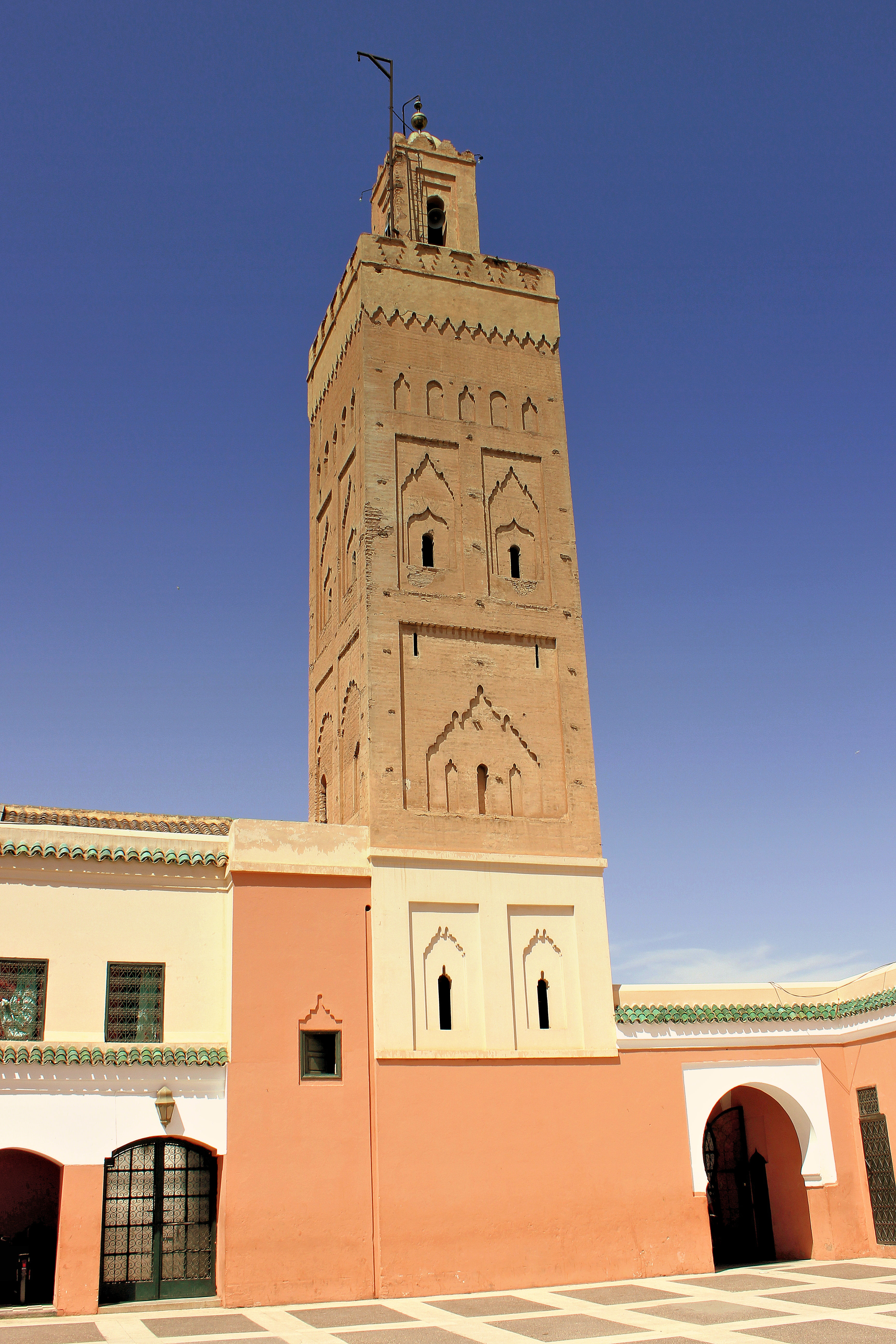
The minaret of the mosque, seen from the east

The mosque is now the only structure of the complex which still largely dates from the Saadian construction under Abu Faris (early 17th century). Its layout and decoration are nearly identical to that of the Mouassine Mosque built by the Saadians earlier in the previous century, although it is smaller than the latter. The mosque follows the usual hypostyle interior form with a courtyard (sahn) occupying most of its northern half. The building is 38 meters long from north to south and 30 meters wide from east to west. Its main entrance, located on its central axis, opens off the southern side of the large northwest courtyard of the complex. This entrance leads to the mosque's interior courtyard, which has a small fountain in its middle and is surrounded by a roofed gallery on three sides, which in turn merges with the interior prayer hall on the south side. The prayer hall, occupying the rest of the building, is divided by rows of horseshoe arches into 7 naves/aisles running perpendicular to the southern wall. The southern wall is also the direction of the qibla, the direction of prayer; the mosque and its neighbouring buildings are in fact oriented 18 degrees east (or counter-clockwise) from the north–south meridian in order to accommodate the estimated direction of prayer. The central nave of the mosque is slightly wider than the others, while the arches directly in front of the southern qibla wall are replaced by another aisle running parallel to that wall; thus, forming the "T"-plan that was found in most medieval mosques in the region. At the middle of the southern wall, aligned with the central nave, is the mosque's mihrab (a wall niche symbolizing the direction of prayer).

The mosque's decoration is similar to that of the Mouassine Mosque and the Bab Doukkala Mosque. It consists of arabesque and geometric motifs carved in stucco around the arches of the prayer hall, as well as more extensive carved stucco decoration on the wall around the mihrab. Although the sculpted decoration is quite fine and consistent with the earlier quality of Saadian craftsmanship, they are currently plastered with heavy layers of paint which dull their features slightly. In addition to arabesque motifs, the carvings around the arch of the mihrab include Arabic inscriptions in a rectangular frame. The inscriptions include a basmala, a tasliya (phrase invoking God's blessing), and verses 36 to 37 of the 24th Sura (An-Nur) of the Qur'an. The opening of the mihrab niche itself is flanked on either side with three engaged columns with ornate capitals, each side being carved from a single block of marble. The space in front of the mihrab is covered by a rectangular cupola carved in muqarnas (stalactite or honeycomb decoration), as are the southeastern and southwestern corners of the mosque, while a smaller octagonal muqarnas dome covers the space inside the mihrab itself. The southern aisle running in front of the qibla wall is also demarcated by an additional parallel row of "lambrequin" arches whose intrados are carved with muqarnas. The mosque's courtyard has zellij decoration along the lower part of the arch pillars surrounding it, while the central arch on its south side (leading to the nave aligned with the mihrab) is filled with a wooden anaza whose upper area is carved with religious inscriptions inside a square frame. The mosque's exterior roofs are covered in green tiles typical of other Moroccan mosques.

The mosque's minaret, which rises from the northeastern corner and overshadows the eastern courtyard of the complex, is slightly more original for its time and had a lasting influence in later Moroccan architecture. The minaret has the usual square base and a double-tiered composition, with a main shaft topped by a smaller secondary shaft or lantern, which in turn is topped by a small dome and finial. Its surface decoration, however, foregoes the earlier tradition of sebka motifs and instead features several tiers of decorative blind arches that frame the minaret's windows. The lowest tier features twin polylobed arches on the southern façade and a large lambrequin arch on its eastern façade, the second tier features twin lambrequin arches on each façade, and the third (highest) tier features a row of small arches alternating between round and pointed lobed profiles. The top of the main shaft is crowned with a molding of saw-tooth merlon shapes, similar to the merlons found on the minarets of other mosques.

At the southwestern corner of the mosque, extending from the southern aisle along the qibla wall, is a room called the bayt al-'itikaf (Arabic: بيت الاعتكف) which served as a space for spiritual retreat. On the south side of the mosque, behind the mihrab, is a square chamber which served as a library, similar to the Saadian library chamber added earlier to the Qarawiyyin Mosque in Fez.

=== The mausoleum ===
The mausoleum chamber, located northeast of the mosque, consists of a square chamber covered by a pyramidal green roof (similar to the mausoleum chambers in other zawiyas of the city). It dates from a reconstruction by Moulay Isma'il in the early 18th century. Its interior ceiling consists of a cupola of painted wood while its walls are decorated with zellij tiling, more carved stucco decoration, and stained-glass windows. The mausoleum building is entered through a monumental portal opening on the north side of the main southeastern courtyard of the complex. The portal is covered with similar decoration and crowned by a caved wooden canopy. This entrance first leads to an inner courtyard with a central fountain. The courtyard measures about 9 meters wide from east to west and 14 meters long from north to south, and the mausoleum chamber is accessed through ornate doorway behind an arched portico on its western side. A small walled cemetery exists outside the mausoleum's northern wall, but a larger cemetery now extends well beyond this to the north and east.

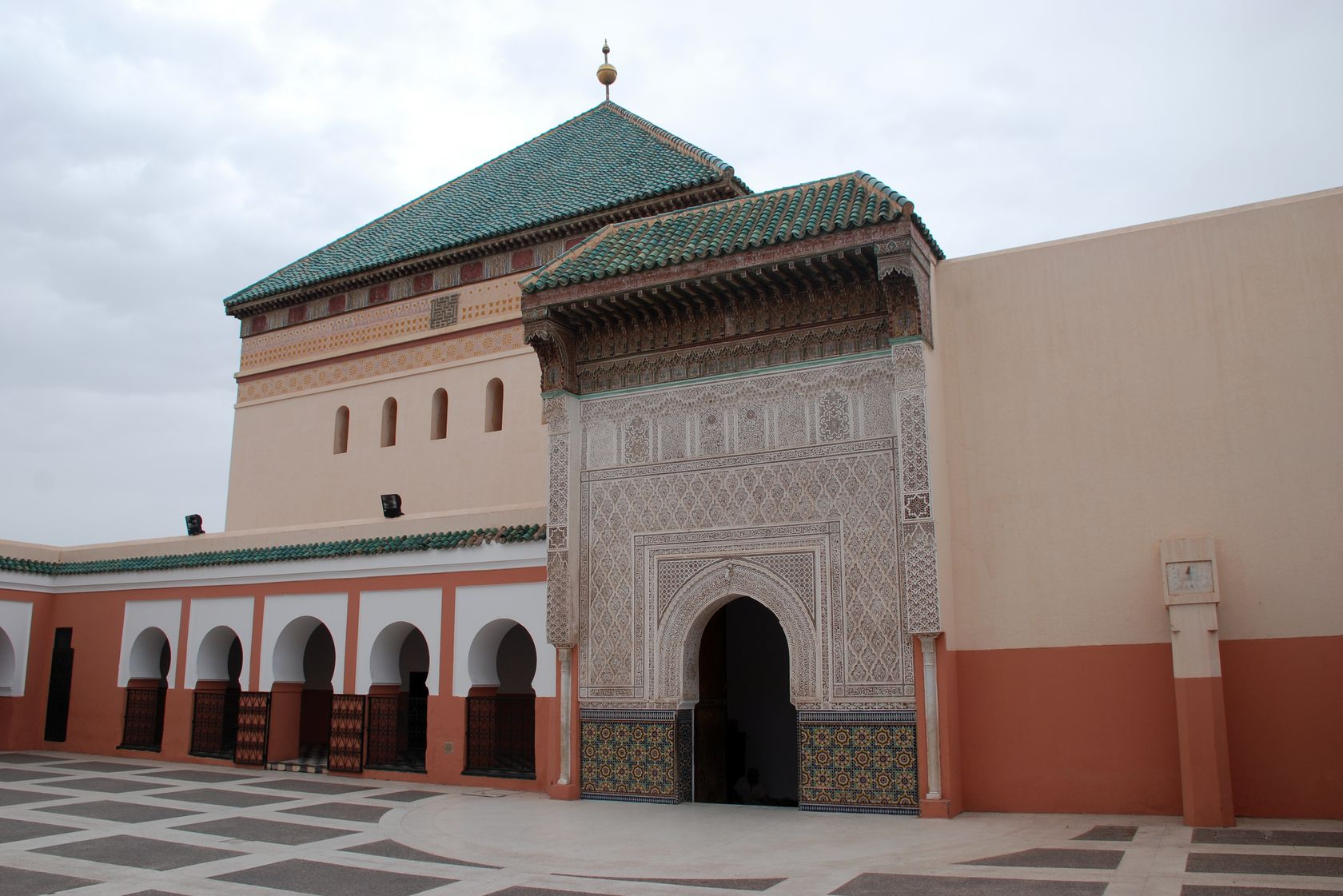
The entrance to the mausoleum, in the main southeast courtyard of the complex

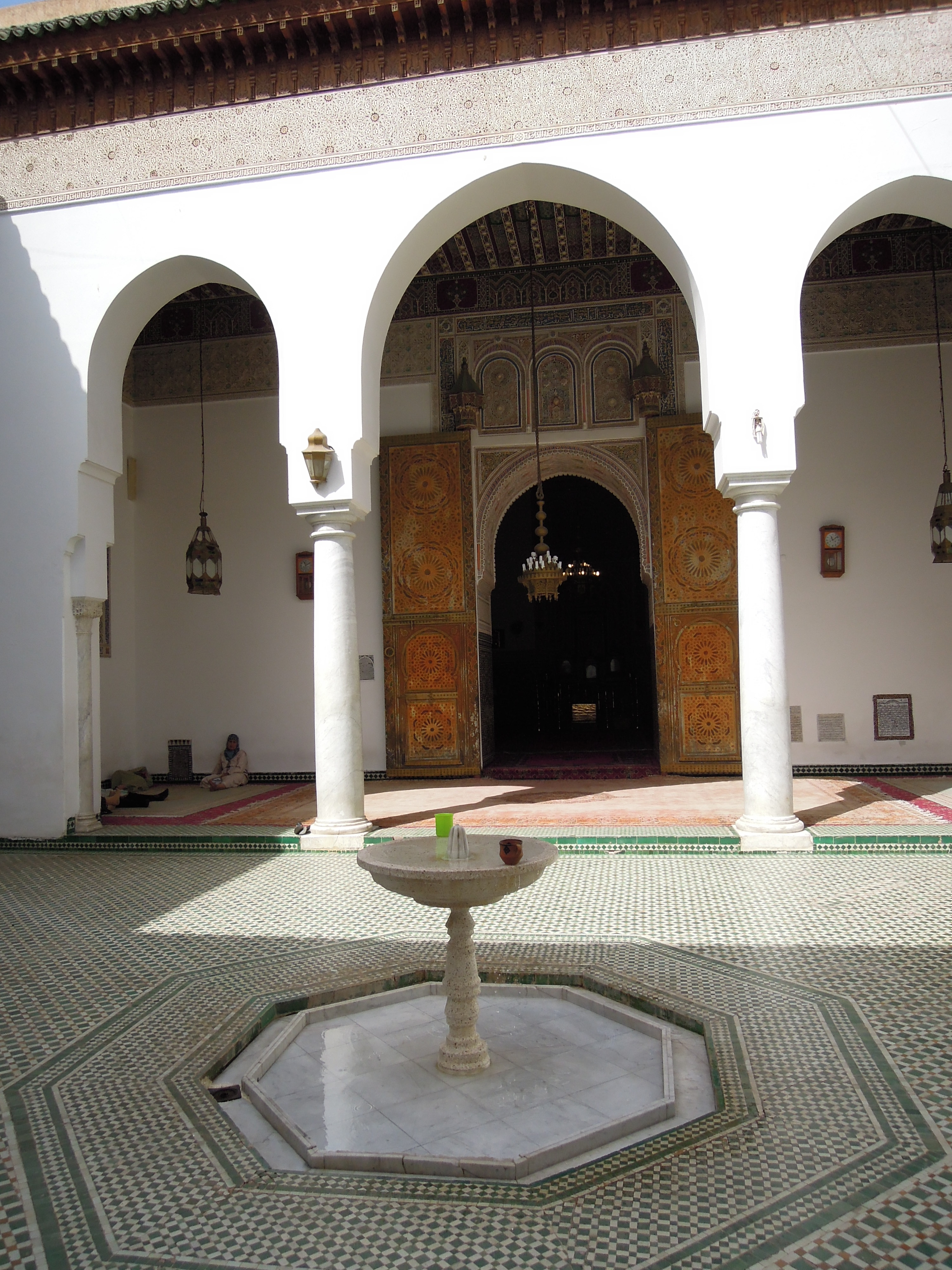
The inner courtyard of the mausoleum building

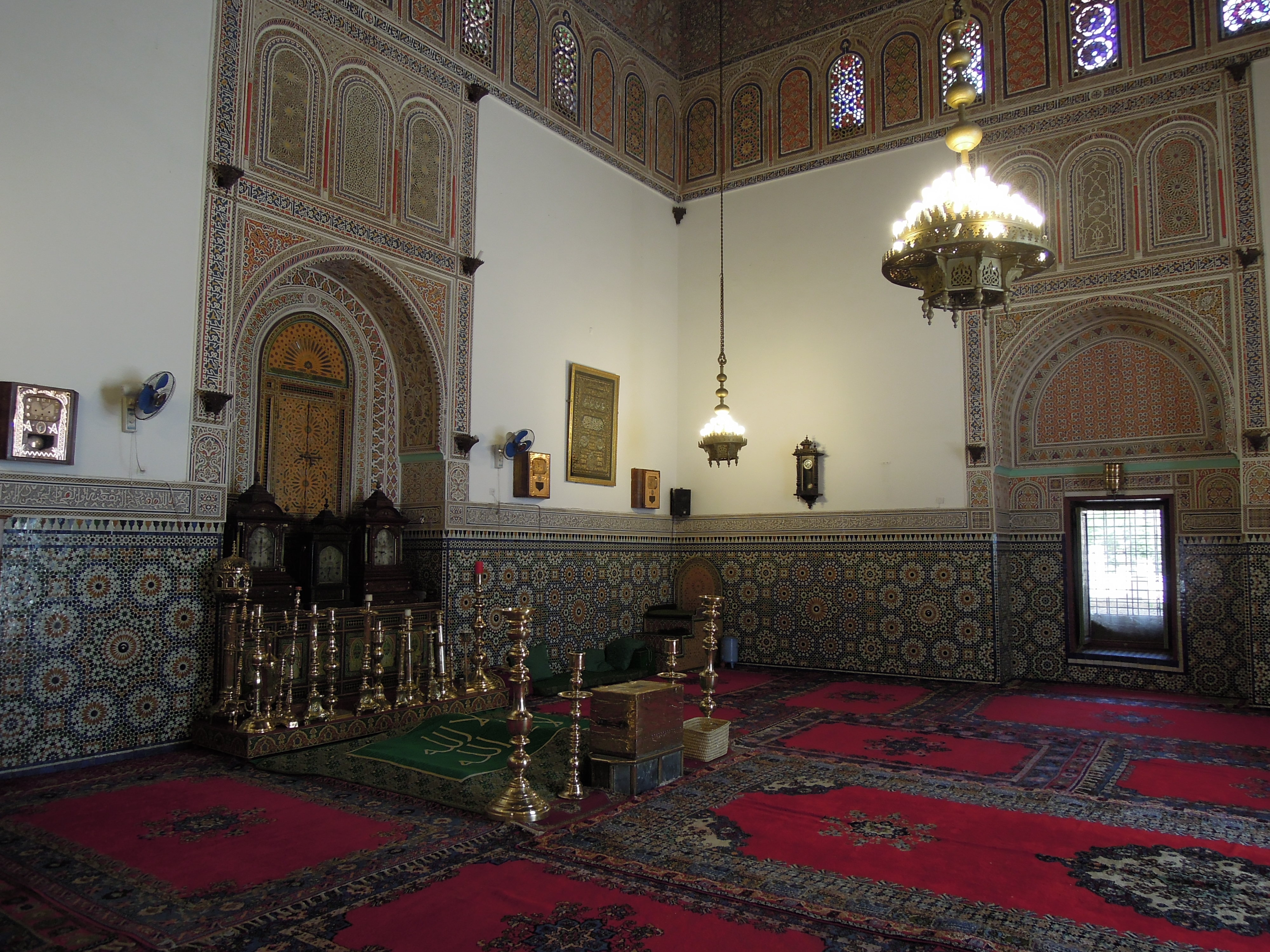
The mausoleum chamber

== See also ==
- Zawiya of Muhammad Ben Sliman al-Jazuli
- Zawiya of Sidi Abd el-Aziz
