= Al-Suhayli =

Islamic scholar (1114–1185)

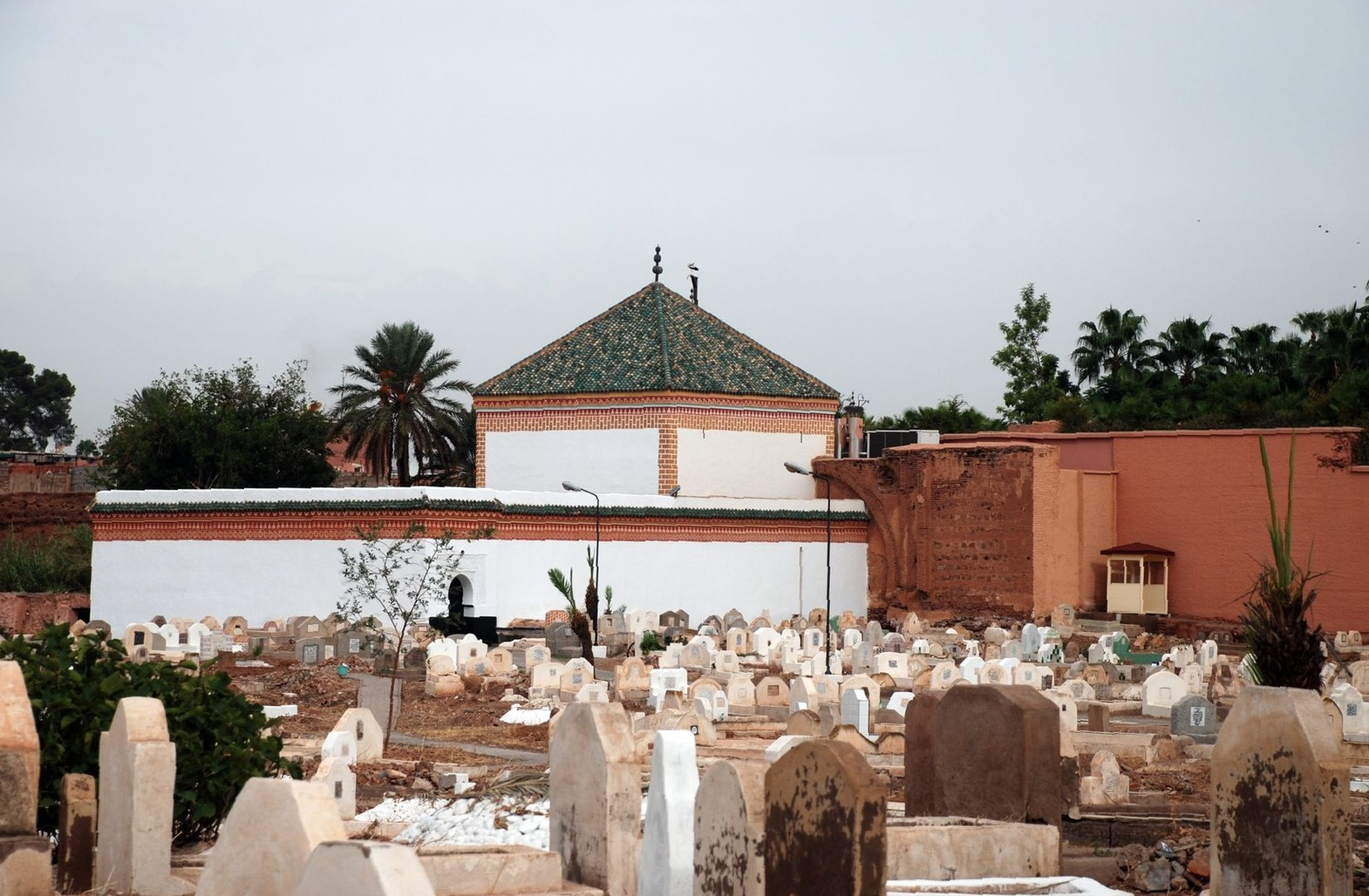
- The Mausoleum of al-Suhayli in Marrakesh

Personal life
- Born: Abu al-Qasim Abd al-Rahman ibn Abd Allah al-Suhayli; 1114 Fuengirola, Al-Andalus (present-day Spain)
- Died: 1185 (aged 70–71) Marrakesh, Morocco
- Notable work(s): al-Rawd al-Unuf

Religious life
- Religion: Islam
- Denomination: Sunni
- Jurisprudence: Maliki

Al-Suhayli (Note: Arabic: أبو القاسم عبد الرحمن بن عبد الله السهيلي, romanized: ʾAbu al-Qāsim ʿAbd al-Raḥmān ibn ʿAbd Allāh al-Suhaylī) (1114 – 1185) was an Islamic scholar and theologian who wrote the book al-Rawd al-Unuf, a commentary on the al-Sira al-Nabawiyya of Ibn Hisham. Al-Suhayli is one of the Seven Saints of Marrakesh.

== Biography and works ==
Al-Suhayli was born in 1114 in Al-Andalus, Fuengirola. He died in 1185 in Marrakesh.

- al-Rawḍ al-unuf fī šarḥ al-sīra al-Nabawiyya li-Ibn Hišām. wa-maʿahu al-Sīra al-Nabawiyya (7 volumes), 1967
- al-Taʿrīf wa-al-iʿlām li-mā ubhima min al-Qurʾān min al-asmāʾ wa-al-aʿlām, Bayrut, 1987
- Translation in German: Die Kommentare des Suhailī und des Abū Ḍarr zu den Uḥud-Gedichten in der Sīra des Ibn Hišam, Schaade, Arthur 1908
