= Abdallah al-Ghazwani =

16th century Muslim saint of Morocco

Abdallah al-Ghazwani عبد الله الغزواني
- Born: Ksar al-Kabir, Morocco
- Died: 1529; Marrakesh, Morocco

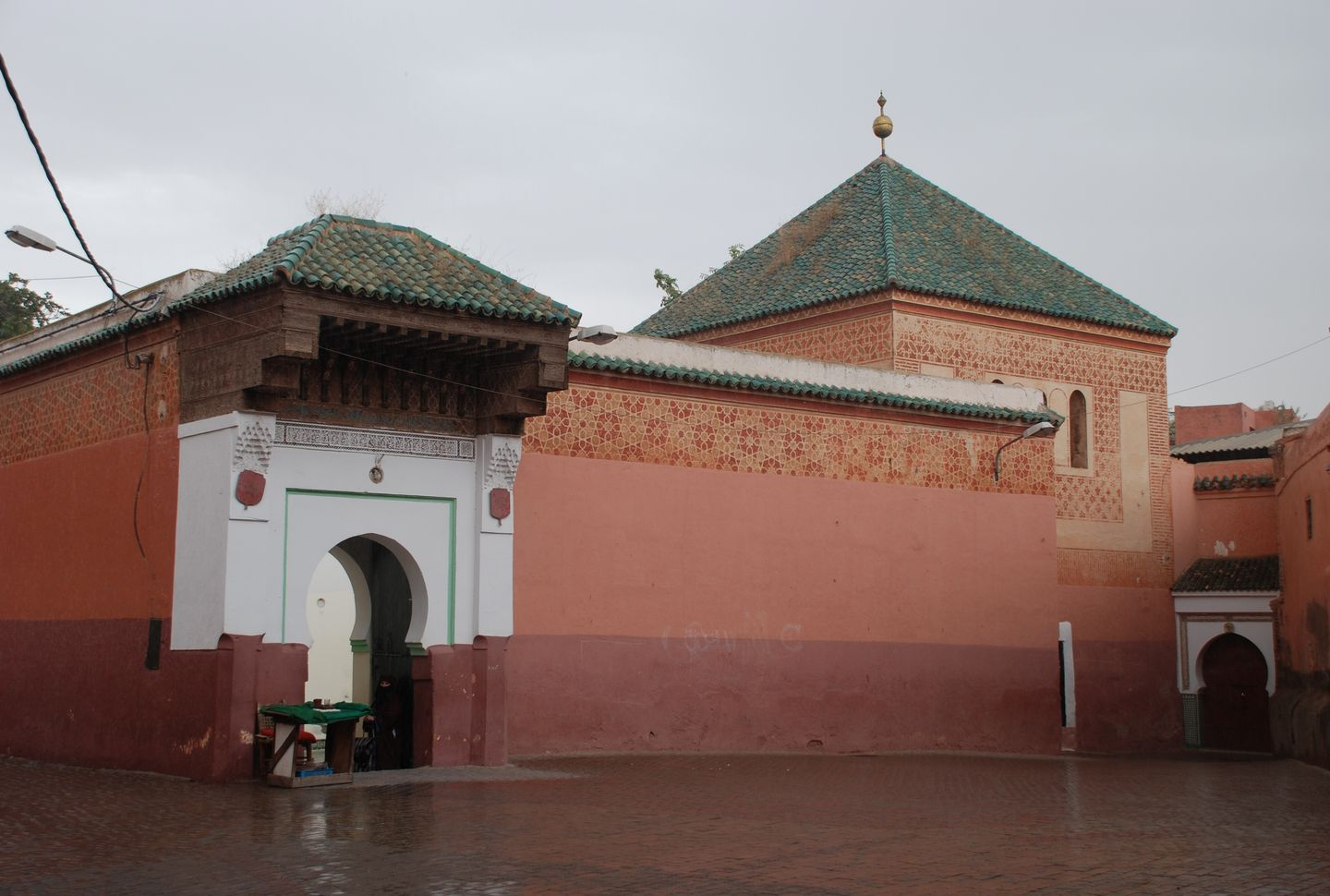
The Mausoleum and zawiya of Sidi al-Ghazwani (or Moulay al-Ksour) in Marrakesh

Abu Mohammed Abdallah al-Ghazwani (Arabic: أبو محمد عبد الله الغزواني) (died in 1529) was a Sufi saint from Morocco in the tradition of al-Jazuli and ash-Shadhili. He was the successor of Abdelaziz al-Tebaa. Some two hundred years after his death he became one of the Sabaatou rijales, the seven saints of Marrakesh. Abdallah al-Ghazwani wrote on the idea of the Tariqa Muhammadiyya. Al-Ghazwani was also renowned for his skill in sinking wells and constructing channels. He established a Sufi order in Fnideq.
