= Bab Doukkala =

City gate in Marrakesh, Morocco

- باب دكالة
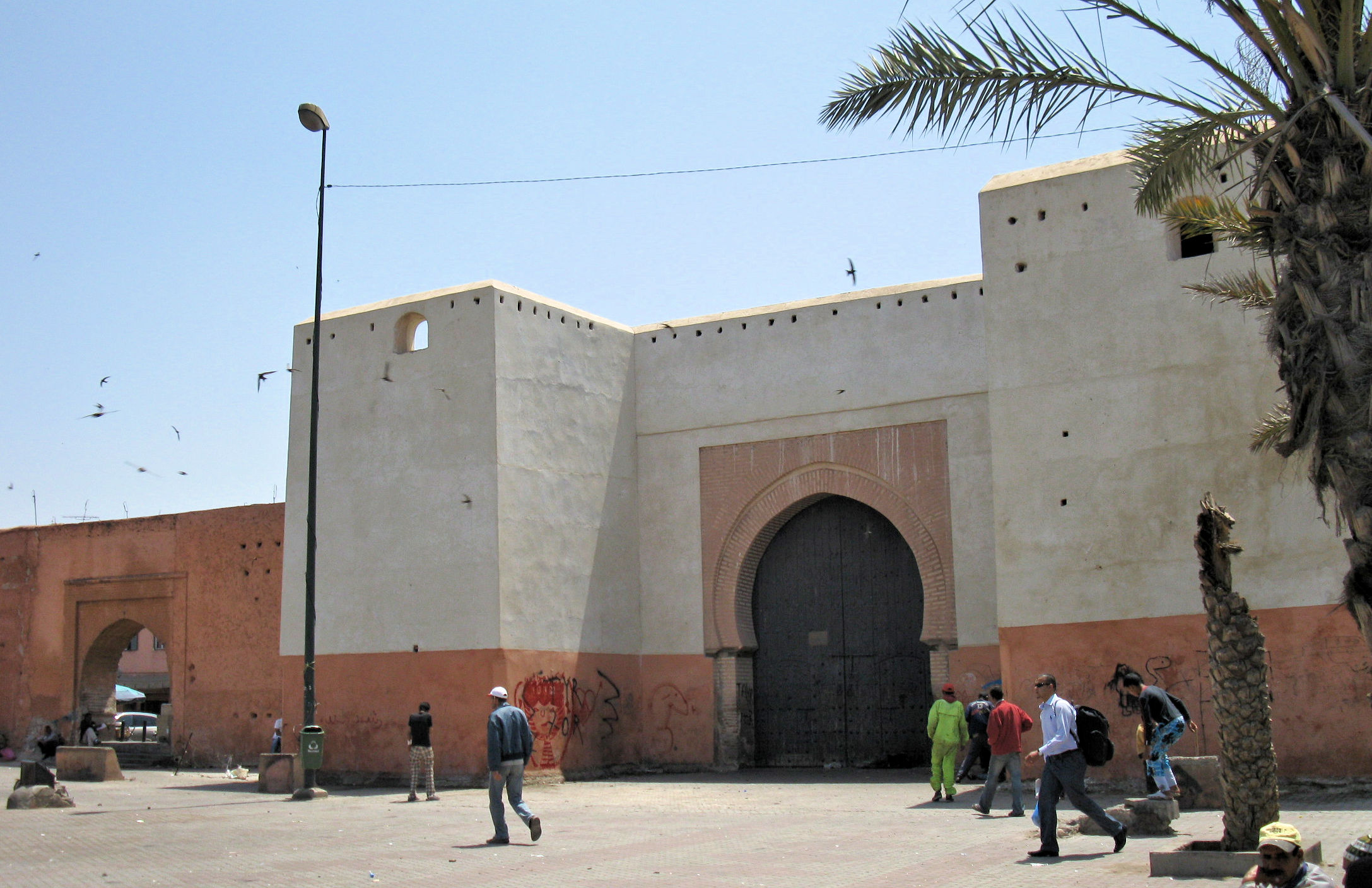
- Interactive map of the Bab Doukkala area

General information
- Type: city gate
- Architectural style: Almoravid, Moorish, Moroccan
- Location: Marrakesh, Morocco
- Coordinates: 31°38′2.2″N 7°59′56.4″W
- Completed: circa 1126

Bab Doukkala (Arabic: باب دكالة, lit. 'gate of the Doukkala') is the main northwestern gate of the medina (historic walled city) of Marrakesh, Morocco.

== Description ==
The gate dates back to around 1126 CE when the Almoravid emir Ali ibn Yusuf built the first walls of the city. Doukkala, was that of both a Berber tribe and of a region between Marrakesh and Casablanca today. Unlike many other gates of the city, it has not been subject to major modifications (at least in its floor plan) and retains its original sophisticated bent entrance design from the Almoravid period. The passage inside the gate bends at a straight angle twice: one enters from the west, turns south, then turns east before emerging into the city. Today the gate is flanked by other simple openings in the wall to allow for easy circulation. The city's main intercity bus terminal is also located just outside and slightly north of Bab Doukkala gate.

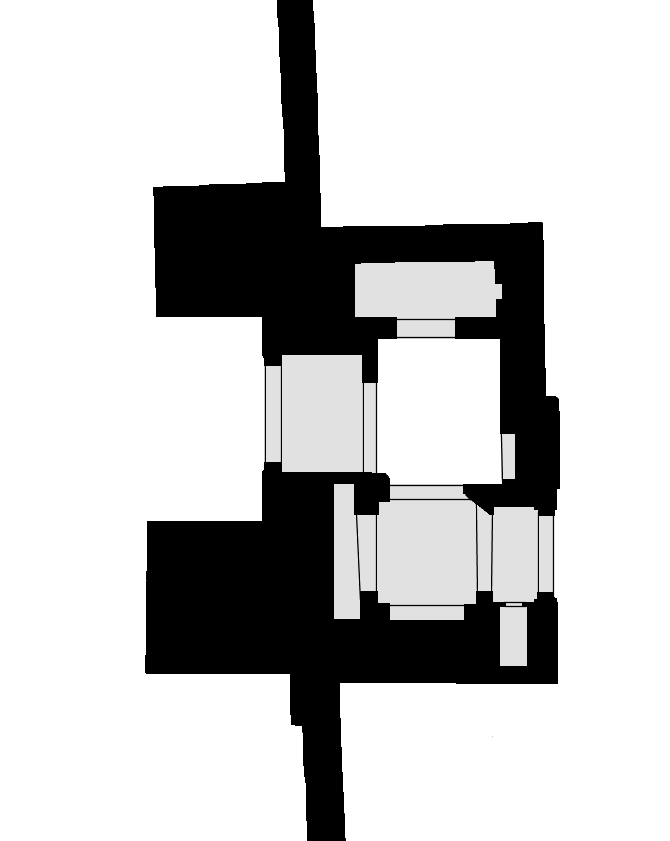
Floor plan of Bab Doukkala (the light grey shaded areas indicate roofed areas inside the gate)

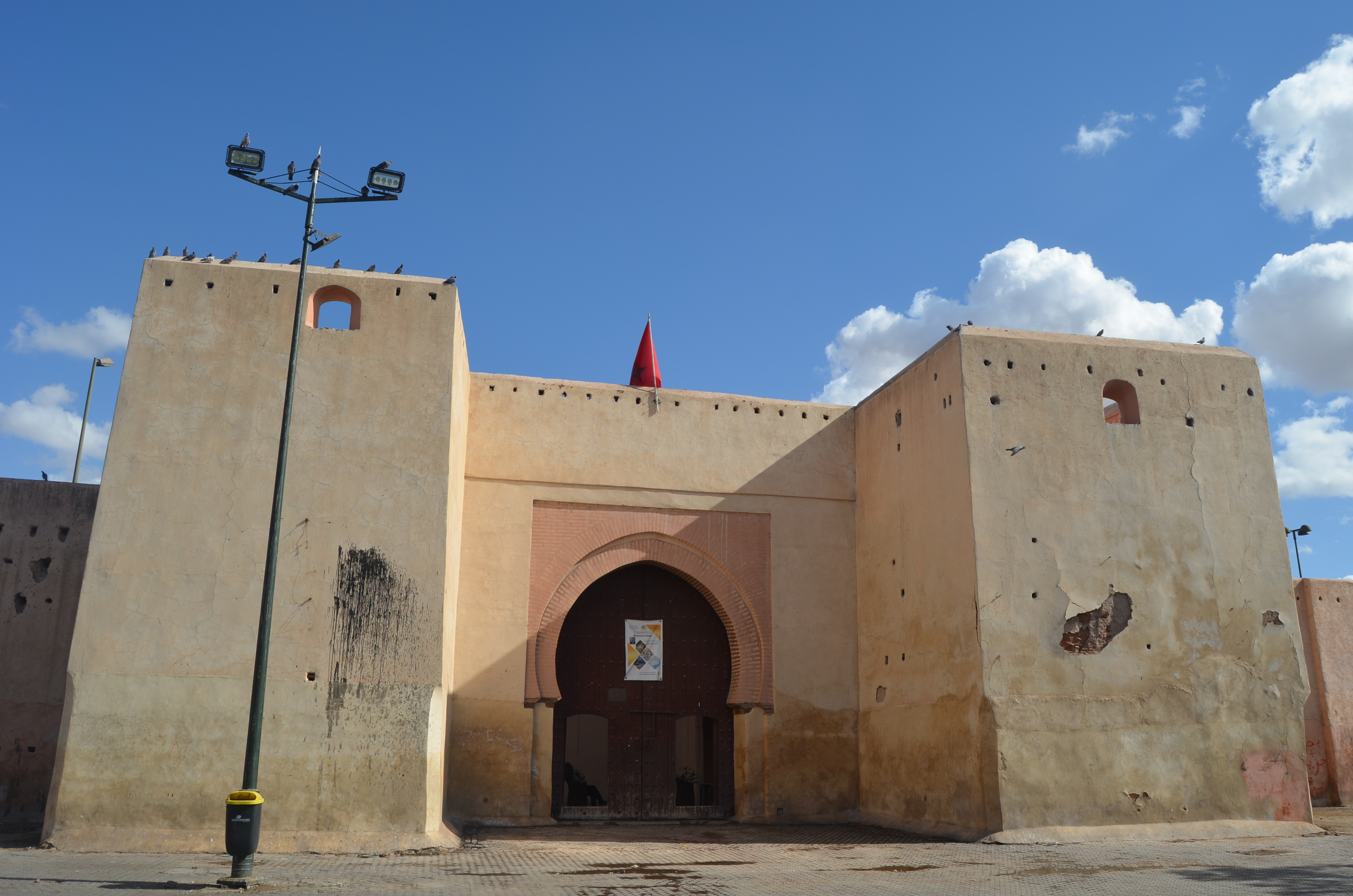
Bab Doukkala exterior (western) facade

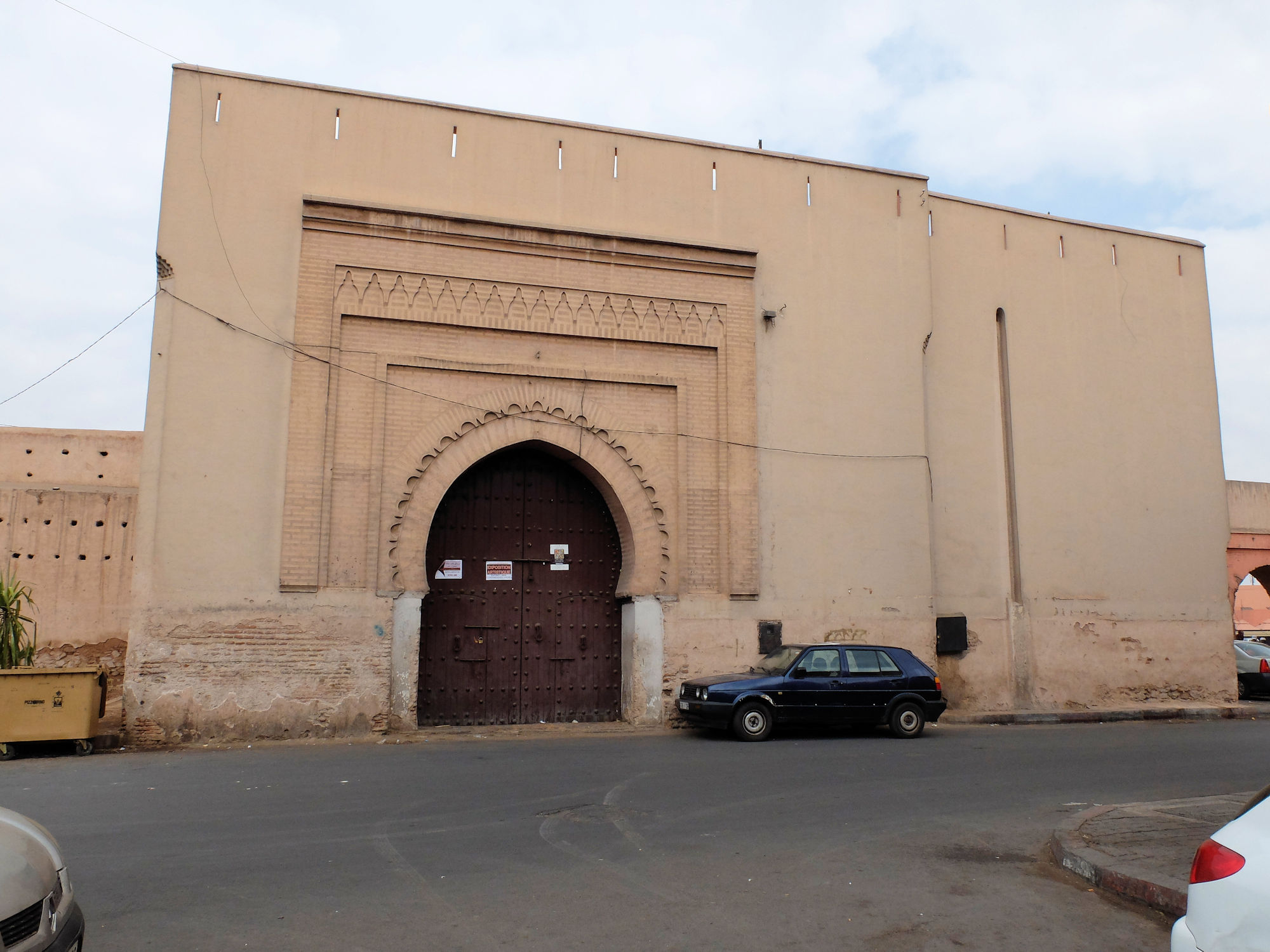
Bab Doukkala inner (eastern) facade
