= Abdelaziz al-Tebaa =

Abdelaziz al-Tebbaa (Arabic: عبد العزيز التباع) or Sidi Abdelaziz ibn Abdelhaq Tebbaa al-Hassani (died 1508) was the founder of the first sufi zawiyya of the Jazuli order in Marrakesh.

== See also ==
- Zawiya of Sidi Abd el-Aziz
