= List of bridges in Morocco =

== Historical or architectural interest bridges ==
Image		Name	Arabic	Distinction	Length	Type	Carries Crosses	Opened	Location	Region	Ref.
	1	Oued Tensift Bridge	قنطرة واد تانسيفت			Masonry; 27 arches	National Route 9 Tensift River	1170	Marrakesh; 31°41′31.7″N 7°59′17.9″W	Marrakesh-Safi	
	2	Oued Sebou Bridge	قنطرة واد سبو		150 m (490 ft)	Masonry; 8 arches	Sebou River	1670	Fez	Fès-Meknès	
	3	Moulay Ismaïl Bridge				Masonry; 10 arches	Oum Er-Rbia River	1687	Kasba Tadla; 32°35′35.4″N 6°16′20″W	Béni Mellal-Khénifra	
	4	Sqala Bridge				Masonry		18th century	Essaouira; 31°30′36.6″N 9°46′25.9″W	Marrakesh-Safi	
	5	Oued Nja Bridge				Masonry; 5 arches	Oued Nja	1870	Douar Oued Njat; 33°59′54.3″N 5°11′18.8″W	Fès-Meknès	
	6	Khenifra Bridge				Masonry	Oum Er-Rbia River	19th century	Khenifra; 32°56′16.7″N 5°40′09.9″W	Béni Mellal-Khénifra	

== Major bridges ==
	Name	Arabic	Span	Length	Type	Carries Crosses	Opened	Location	Region	Ref.
1	Mohammed VI Bridge	جسر محمد السادس	376 m (1,234 ft)	952 m (3,123 ft)	Cable-stayed; Concrete deck and pylons 183+376+183	Contournement de Rabat; Bou Regreg	2014	Rabat; 33°56′19.8″N 6°45′34.7″W	Rabat-Salé-Kénitra	
2	Sidi Maârouf Bridge	جسر سيدي معروف	136 m (446 ft)	224 m (735 ft)	Cable-stayed; Composite steel/concrete deck	National Route 11	2019	Casablanca; 33°32′23.0″N 7°38′25.9″W	Casablanca-Settat	
3	Oued Sherrat Bridge		103 m (338 ft)		Suspension; Pylônes maçonnerie	National Route 1 Oued Sherrat	1922	Skhirat; 33°48′53.2″N 7°6′36.4″W	Rabat-Salé-Kénitra	
4	Oued Ikem Bridge		103 m (338 ft)		Suspension; Pylônes maçonnerie	National Route 1 Oued Ikem	1922	Skhirat; 33°52′24.1″N 6°59′42.1″W	Rabat-Salé-Kénitra	
5	Hassan-II Bridge	جسر الحسن الثاني	76 m (249 ft)	1,215 m (3,986 ft)	Arch; Concrete deck arch	National Route 1 Rabat–Salé tramway (T1, T2); Bou Regreg	2011	Rabat; 34°01′38.4″N 6°49′10.0″W	Rabat-Salé-Kénitra	
6	Oued Laabid Bridge				Suspension; Steel deck, concrete pylons	R302; Oued Laabid		Ouaouizeght; 32°7′55.4″N 6°18′1.6″W	Béni Mellal-Khénifra	

== See also ==
- Transport in Morocco
- Oued Fes
- List of aqueducts in the Roman Empire
