= Mohammed VI Bridge =

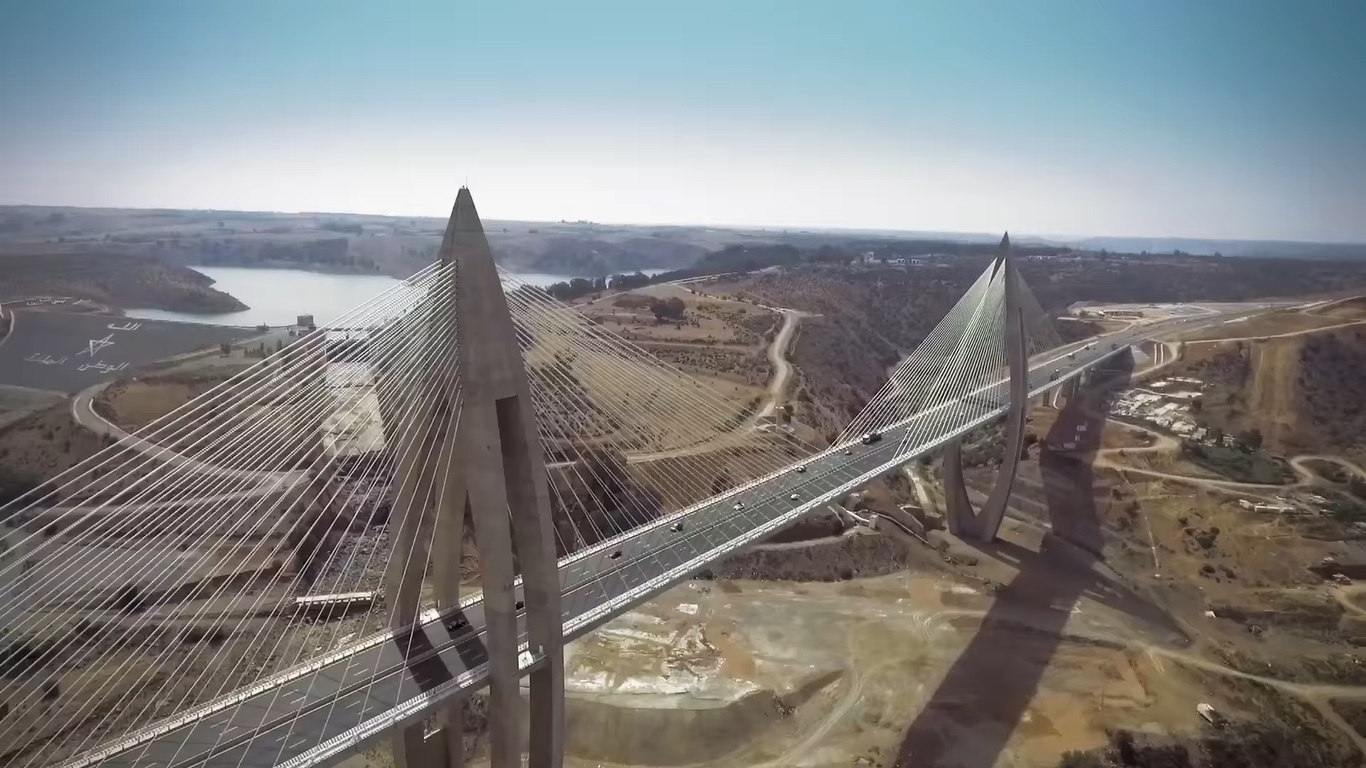
- Coordinates: 33°56′16″N 6°45′33″W
- Carries: 6 lanes, pedestrians
- Crosses: Bou Regreg
- Locale: Rabat, Morocco
- Official name: Mohammed VI Bridge

Characteristics
- Design: Cable-stayed bridge
- Material: Concrete
- Total length: 951.66 m (3,122.2 ft)
- Width: 30 m (98 ft)
- Height: 197.45 m (647.8 ft)
- Longest span: 376 m (1,234 ft)
- Clearance below: 100 m (330 ft)

History
- Construction start: 2011
- Construction end: 2016
- Opened: July 7, 2016

Statistics
- Daily traffic: 20,000

Location
- Interactive map of Mohammed VI Bridge

The Mohammed VI Bridge (Arabic: جسر محمد السادس) is a cable-stayed bridge that spans the valley of the Bouregreg River near Rabat in Morocco. It is named after the current king of Morocco.

The bridge is characterised by its architecture comprising two 200-meters high arched towers, which symbolize the new doors to the cities of Rabat and Salé. The deck is supported by two sets of 20 pairs of parallel multi-strand stay cables.

The structure forms part of the new 41.5 km Rabat motorway bypass around the city of Rabat and will improve traffic congestion in Hay Riad, the capital's western residential suburb.

== See also ==
- Rabat Ring Road
- List of bridges in Morocco
- List of highest bridges
- List of tallest bridges
