= Landmarks of Marrakesh =

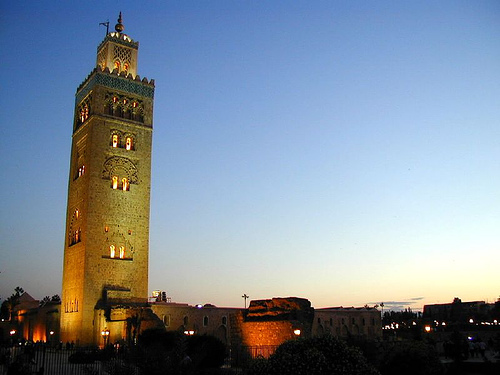
Koutoubia Mosque

This article describes notable landmarks, architecture, and museums in the city of Marrakesh, Morocco.

== Plazas and squares ==
=== Jemaa el-Fnaa ===
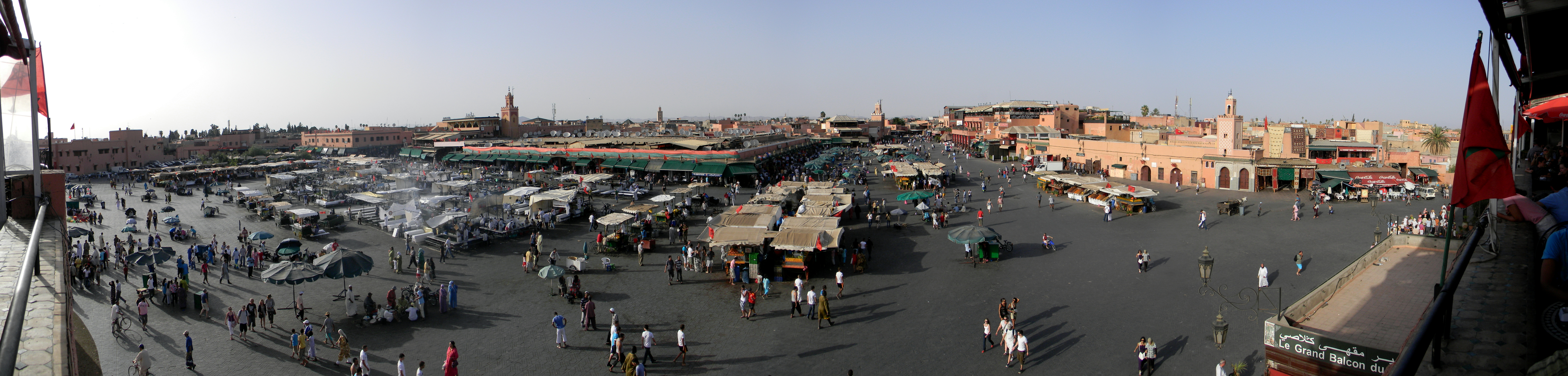
Panorama, looking across the Jemaa el-Fnaa

The Jemaa el-Fnaa or Djemaa el Fna is the centre of activity in the medina (old city). It has been part of the UNESCO World Heritage site since 1985. The square's name has several possible meanings, but the most plausible etymology endorsed by historians is that it meant "ruined mosque" or "mosque of annihilation", referring to the construction of a mosque within the square in the late 16th century that was left unfinished and fell into ruin. The square was originally an open space for markets located on the east side of the Ksar el-Hajjar, the main fortress and palace of the Almoravid dynasty who founded Marrakesh as their capital in 1070. Following the takeover of the city by the Almohads, a new royal palace complex was founded to the south of the city and the old Almoravid palace was abandoned, but the market square remained. Subsequently, with the fortunes of the city, Jemaa el-Fnaa saw periods of decline and also renewal.

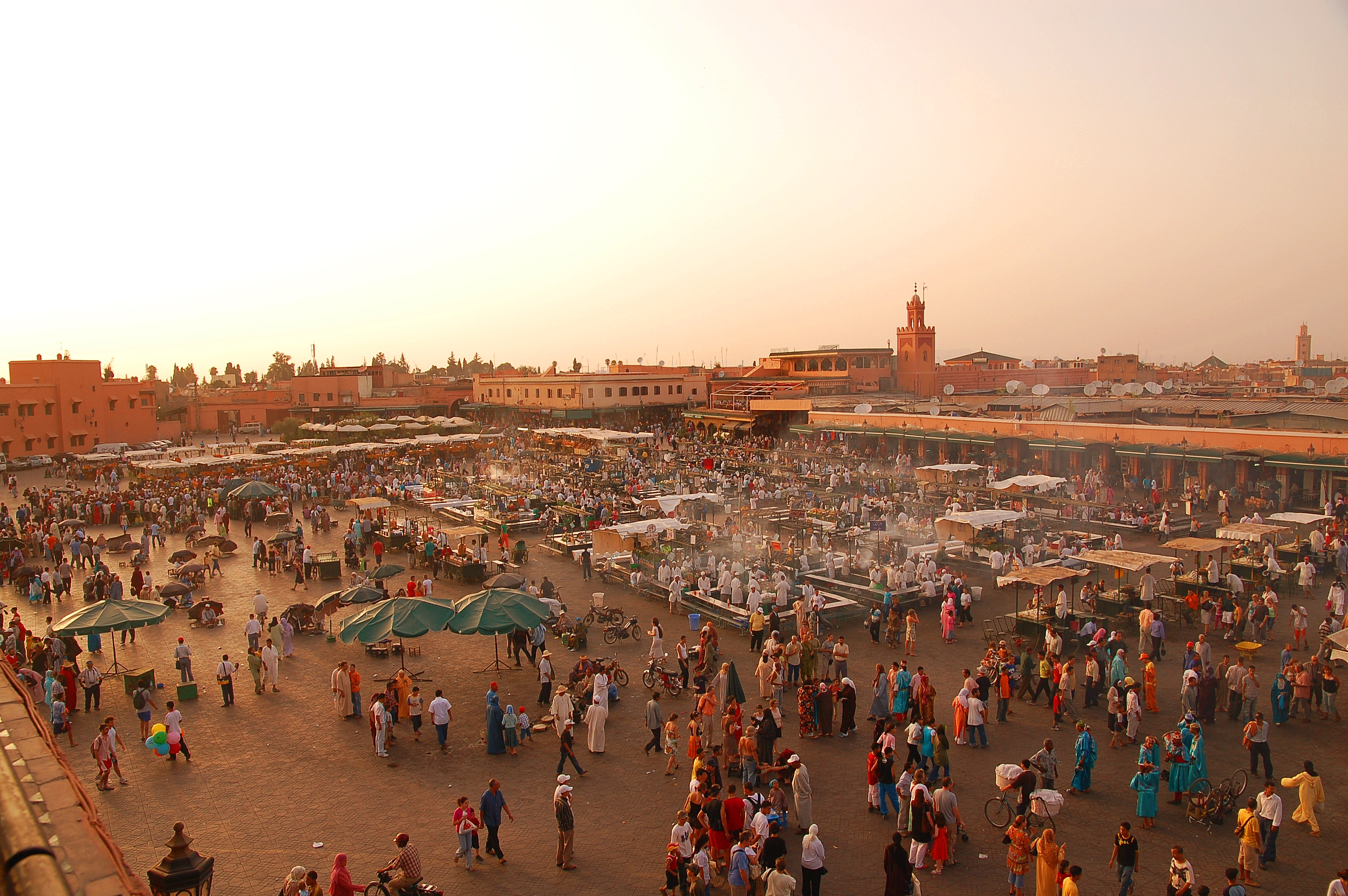

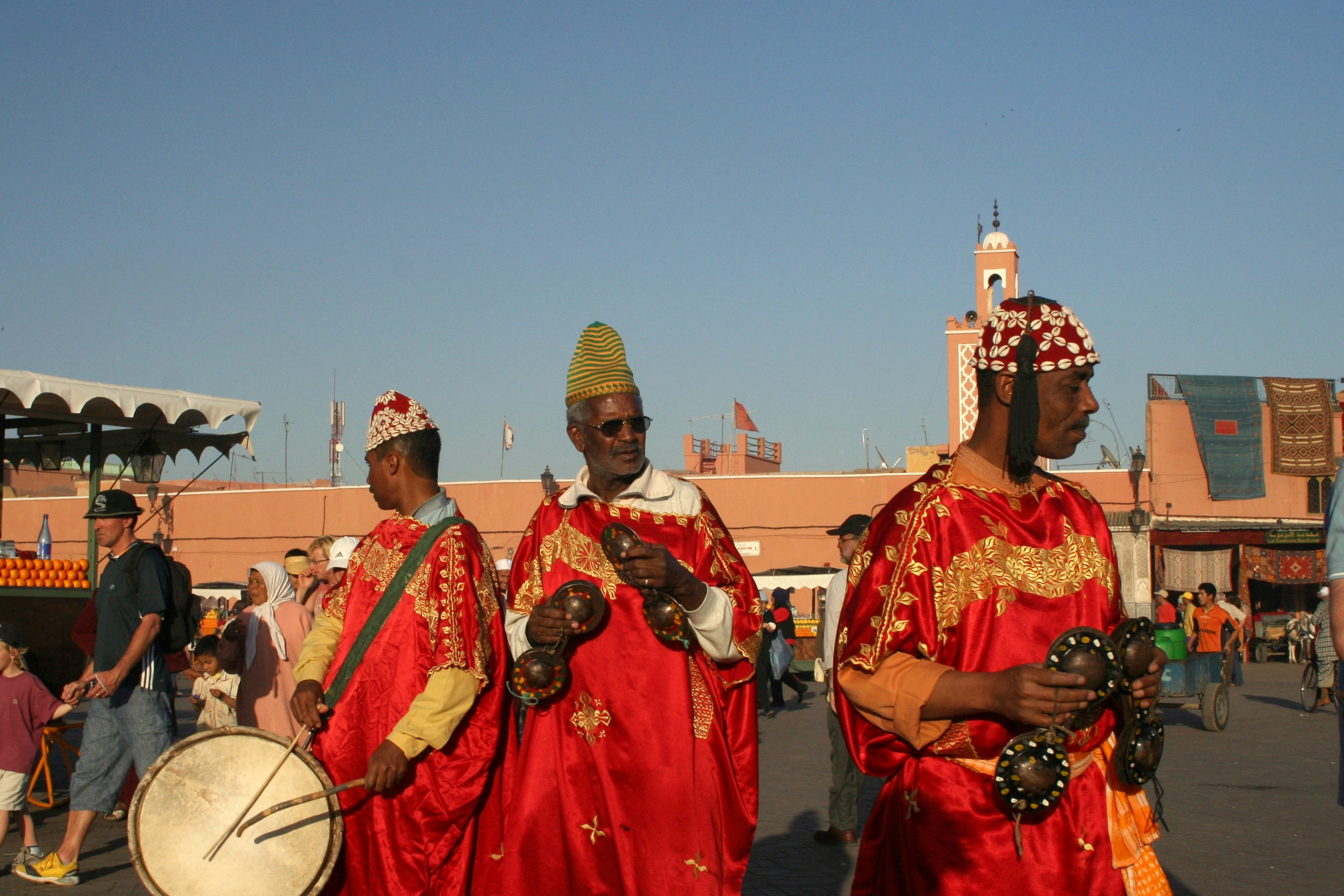
Jemaa el-Fnaa

Historically this square was used for public executions and decapitations by the rulers to maintain their power by frightening the people. The square attracted dwellers from the surrounding desert and mountains to trade here and stalls were set up on the square from early in its history. The square attracted tradesmen in foods, animal forage and domestic items, snake charmers ("wild, dark, frenzied men with long disheveled hair falling over their naked shoulders"), Berber women in long robes, camels and donkeys, dancing boys of the Chleuh Atlas tribe, and shrieking musicians with pipes, tambourines and African drums. Today the square attracts people from a diversity of social and ethnic backgrounds and tourists from all around the world. Snake charmers, acrobats, magicians, mystics, musicians, monkey trainers, herb sellers, story-tellers, dentists, pickpockets, and entertainers in medieval garb still populate the square. It has been described as a "world-famous square", "a metaphorical urban icon, a bridge between the past and the present, the place where (spectacularized) Moroccan tradition encounters modernity."

=== Others ===
Place des Ferblantiers is a square located at the junction of the original medina and the Kasbah, between the Badi Palace and the Bahia Palace. The Mellah is also accessible from here, along with a small spice market. The square was traditionally occupied by metalworkers, but only a few of these remain today.

Other squares and plazas include El Mashwar, El Moussalla, Place Bab Doukkala, Square Charles de Foucauld, Place de la Liberté, Place du 16 Novembre, Place Sidi Ahmed El Kamel, Place Youssef Ben Tachfine, Place Mourabiten, Square Bir Anzaran.

== Souks and merchant structures ==
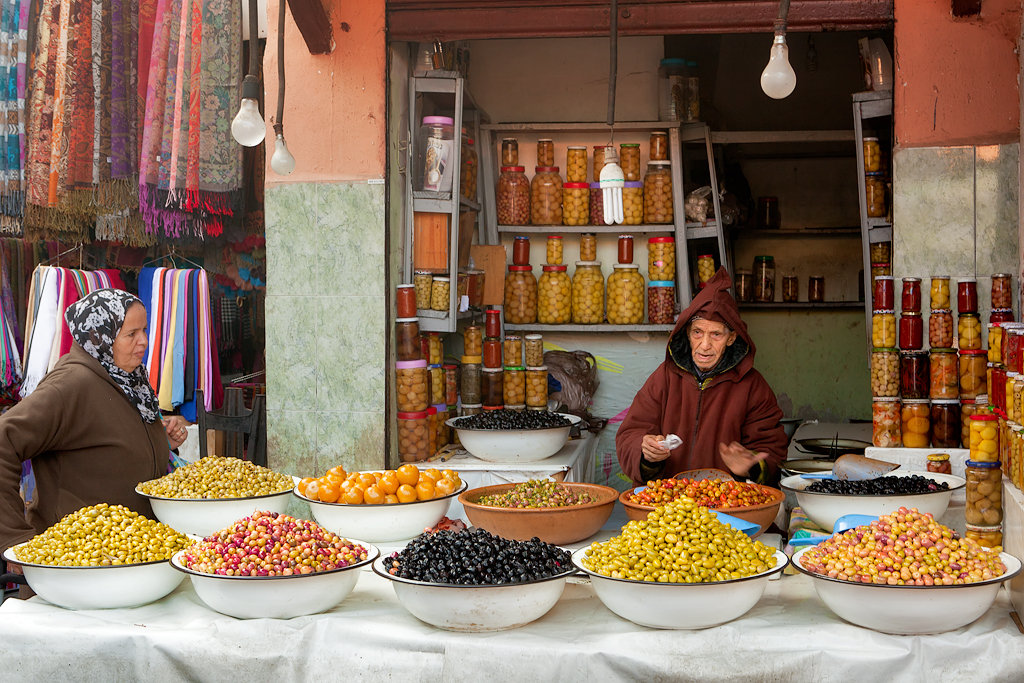
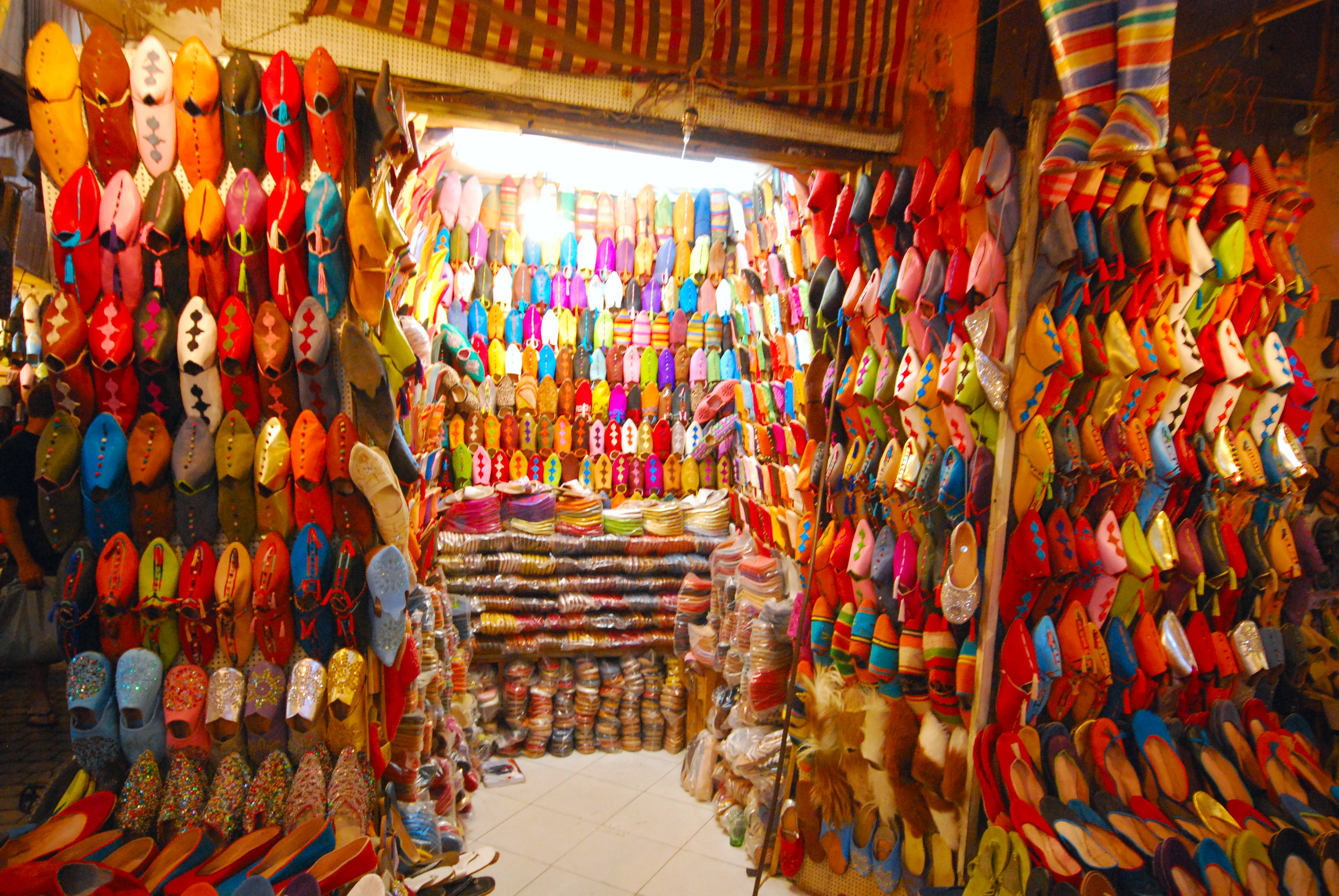
Olives and colourful bejewelled slippers for sale

=== Souks ===
Marrakech has the largest traditional markets in Morocco and the image of the city is closely associated with its souks. They represent a mix of Berber and Arab heritage: for example, while the city was founded by a Berber dynasty (the Almoravids) and most of the city's inhabitants were of Berber origin, the names of most professions and of the souks specialized in them are from Arabic. Paul Sullivan cites the souks as the principal shopping attraction in the city, describing it as "a honeycomb of intricately connected alleyways, this fundamental section of the old city is a micro-medina in itself, comprising a dizzying number of stalls and shops that range from itsy kiosks no bigger than an elf's wardrobe to scruffy store-fronts that morph into glittering Aladdin's Caves once you're inside." Historically the souks of Marrakech were divided into areas of retail, including leather, carpets, metalwork, pottery, etc. The areas are still roughly ordered but there is significant overlap today. There is also an important distinction between permanent souks and temporary souks. The former are permanent market zones filled with boutiques and shops, typically established along the city's most important streets, while the latter are makeshift markets that appear either daily or weekly in certain open areas. Many temporary souks take place just outside the city gates. The flea market outside Bab el-Khemis (the "Thursday Gate"), for example, traditionally took place every Thursday, though today it is present on most days of the week. Other temporary souks take place in some of the city's squares. For example, the Rahba Kedima (meaning "Old Square/Plaza") had specific areas designated for the auction of particular goods at designated times every week, such as wool, carpets, weapons and (historically) slaves.

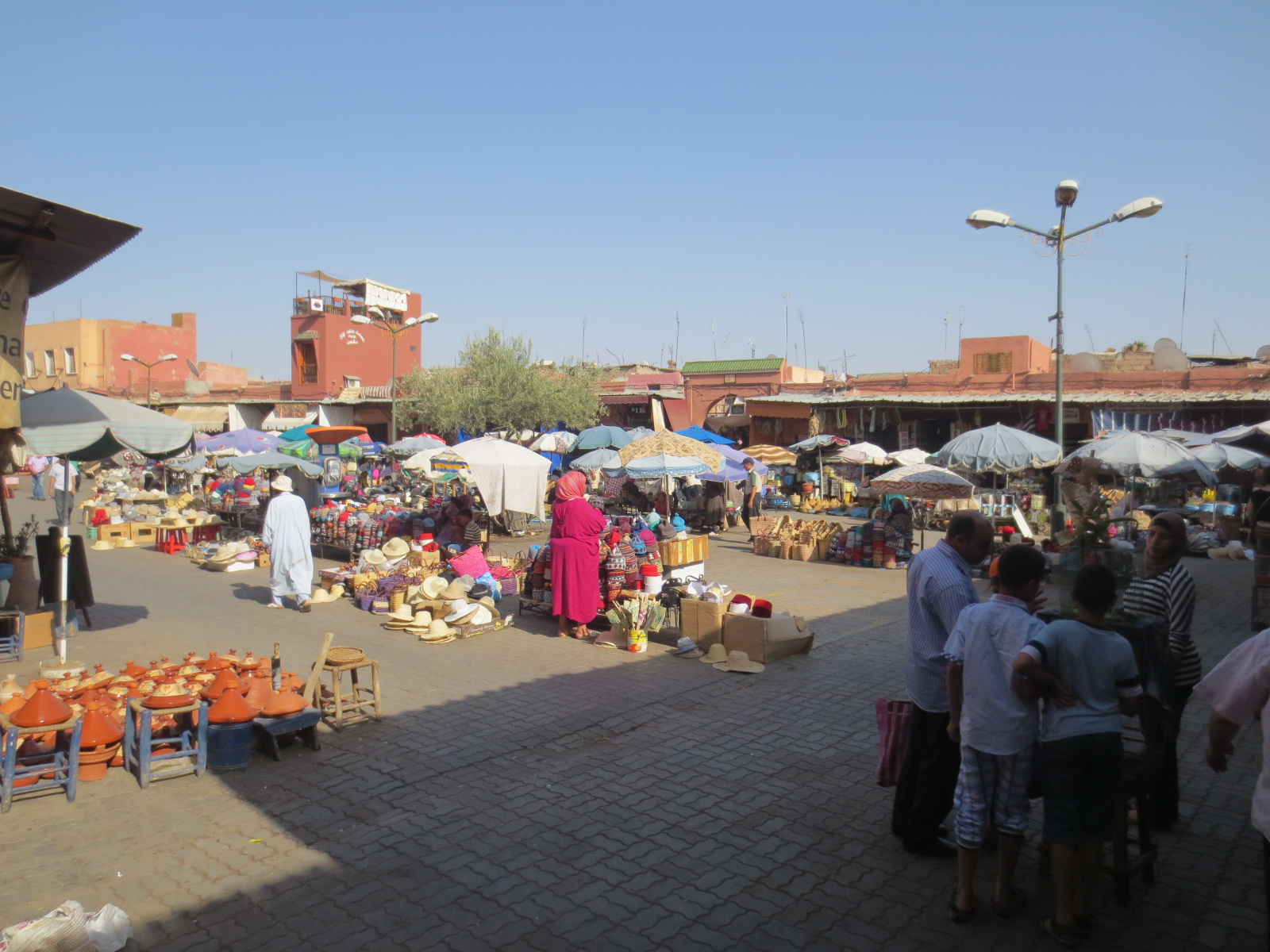
Rahba Kedima ("Old Square") in the souks of the medina

Unlike other historic Islamic cities, where the most expensive goods were sold near the city's main mosques, the geographic organization of specialized trades in the permanent souks of Marrakesh was not necessarily dependent on the location of important mosques. Instead, the souks are organized across a vast area stretching between Jemaa al-Fnaa to the south and the Ben Youssef Mosque to the north. Some of the souks are (or historically were) housed within their own structural complex called a kissaria or qaysariyya. These sprawling structures accommodate numerous shops within standardly constructed units that were traditionally closed and opened with two wooden slats (one on the bottom and one on top). They also have their own gates and were traditionally closed off at night. One example of a kissaria today is the series of four parallel lanes (running roughly northwest to southeast), divided by another lane down their middle, which is located between the two main streets that fork off the northern end of Souk Semmarine, at heart of the souks. This kissaria may have been laid out in Almohad times (12th-13th centuries) and was historically specialized in textiles and clothing. Another kissaria, also specialized in clothing, used to be located at the northern end of the souks. It consisted of a long linear structure, housing a covered lane with shops on either side, running along the south side of the Ben Youssef Mosque, between the mosque and the Almoravid Qubba today. It was demolished in the 20th century to improve circulation within the medina. The remaining open square there today is still known as Place de La Kissaria.

Many of the souks sell items such as carpets and rugs, traditional Muslim attire, leather bags, and lanterns etc. Haggling is still a very important part of trade in the souks. One of the largest souks is Souk Semmarine ("Market of the Farriers"), the main souk street running north from Jemaa el-Fnaa, which sells anything from brightly coloured bejewelled sandals and slippers and leather pouffes to jewellery and kaftans. Furth north, Souk Semmarine branches off into two main streets: Souk el-Kebir (the "Great Market") to the northeast and Souk el-Attarine ("Spice Market") to the northwest. Off these main streets are various other markets and shop streets. Rahba Kedima, a triangular open plaza to the east of Souk Semmarine, contains stalls selling hand-woven baskets, natural perfumes, knitted hats, scarves and T-shirts, Ramadan tea, ginseng, and alligator and iguana skins. The Criée Berbère (French for "Berber Auction"), to the northeast of this market, is noted for its dark Berber carpets and rugs. Souk Ableuh contains stalls which specialize in the retail of olives, a variety of types and colours including green, red, and black olives, lemons, chilis, capers, and pickles and mint, a common ingredient of Moroccan cuisine and tea. Similarly, Souk Kchacha specializes in dried fruit and nuts, including dates and figs, walnuts, cashews and apricots. Souk Siyyaghin is noted for its jewellery, and Souk Smata nearby is noted for its extensive collection of babouches and belts. Souk Cherratine specializes in leatherware, and Souk Belaarif sells modern consumer goods. Souk Haddadine ("Market of the Blacksmiths") specializes in ironware and lanterns. Souk Sebbaghin, the Dyers' Souk (also Souk des Teinturiers, in French), is located near here and is notable for the dyed wools, skins, and silks which are hung above the street to dry.

Ensemble Artisanal is a government-run complex of small arts and crafts which has a reasonable range of goods dealing with leather, textiles and carpets. In the workshop at the back of this shop young people are taught a range of crafts.

=== Funduqs ===
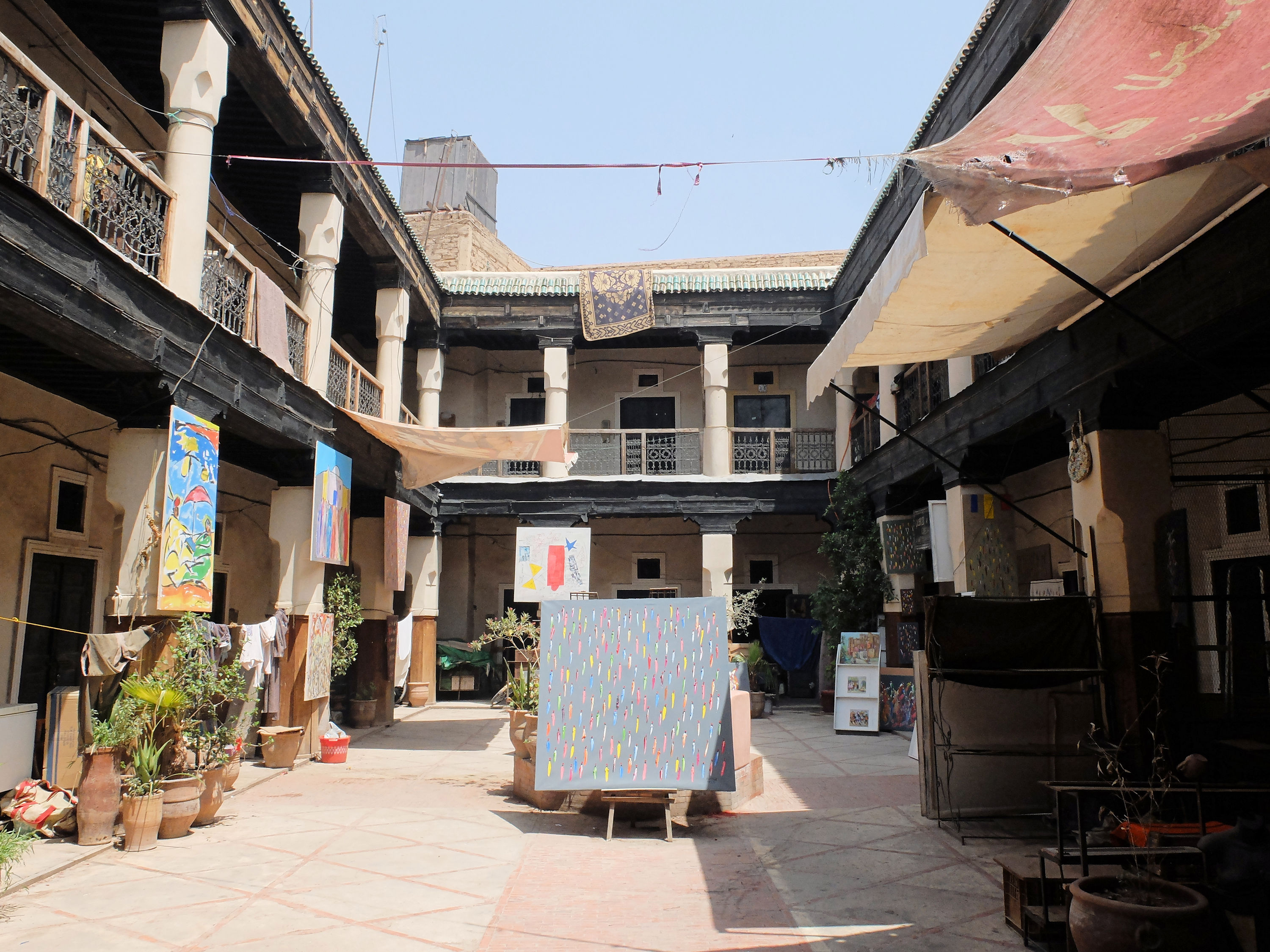
A traditional funduq in the Mouassine neighbourhood

A funduq (also spelled fondouk or foundouk) is a traditional type of merchant building in Morocco and across much of the historic Muslim world. Also known as a caravanserai, in other regions it is variously called a khan or wikala. Funduqs were typically one or two stories tall and centered around a large courtyard surrounded by a gallery which gave access to rooms across each floor. The ground floor was usually used for storage of merchant goods and animals while the upper floors contained rooms and accommodations for merchants from outside the city. More than just inns, they were also places of business. For convenience, they were mostly along the city's major streets or near its main gates, usually within the main commercial districts and near its workshops. Some funduqs were specialized for particular types of goods: for example, the funduq as-sukkar was specialized in the sugar trade, the funduq al-'atriyya was for spice merchants, etc. Others were associated with particular merchant guilds or even with particular Sufi religious brotherhoods.

The existence of funduqs in Marrakesh dates to beginning of its history. Their activity, prominence, and number waxed and waned according to the city's periods of prosperity and decline. The peaks of such prosperity were during the Almoravid and Almohad periods (11th-13th centuries), the Saadian period (16th century), and under certain later Alaouite sultans. In the 20th century, however, the major social changes brought about by French colonial rule (1912-1956), such as the expansion of the city outside its historic walls and the rural exodus across the country, has resulted in many funduqs being converted to low-cost permanent housing, and the steady degradation of their architectural fabric. The majority, however, are still partly or exclusively occupied by artisan workshops and continue to serve a commercial purpose. Some have been restored in recent years. According to municipal statistics, at the end of the 2010s there were 96 funduqs in Marrakesh, which is less than the 132 counted in a 1972 survey. Among other examples, several well-preserved and accessible funduqs are located on and off the main streets of the Mouassine district, between the Mouassine Mosque and the Ben Youssef Mosque.

== City walls and gates ==
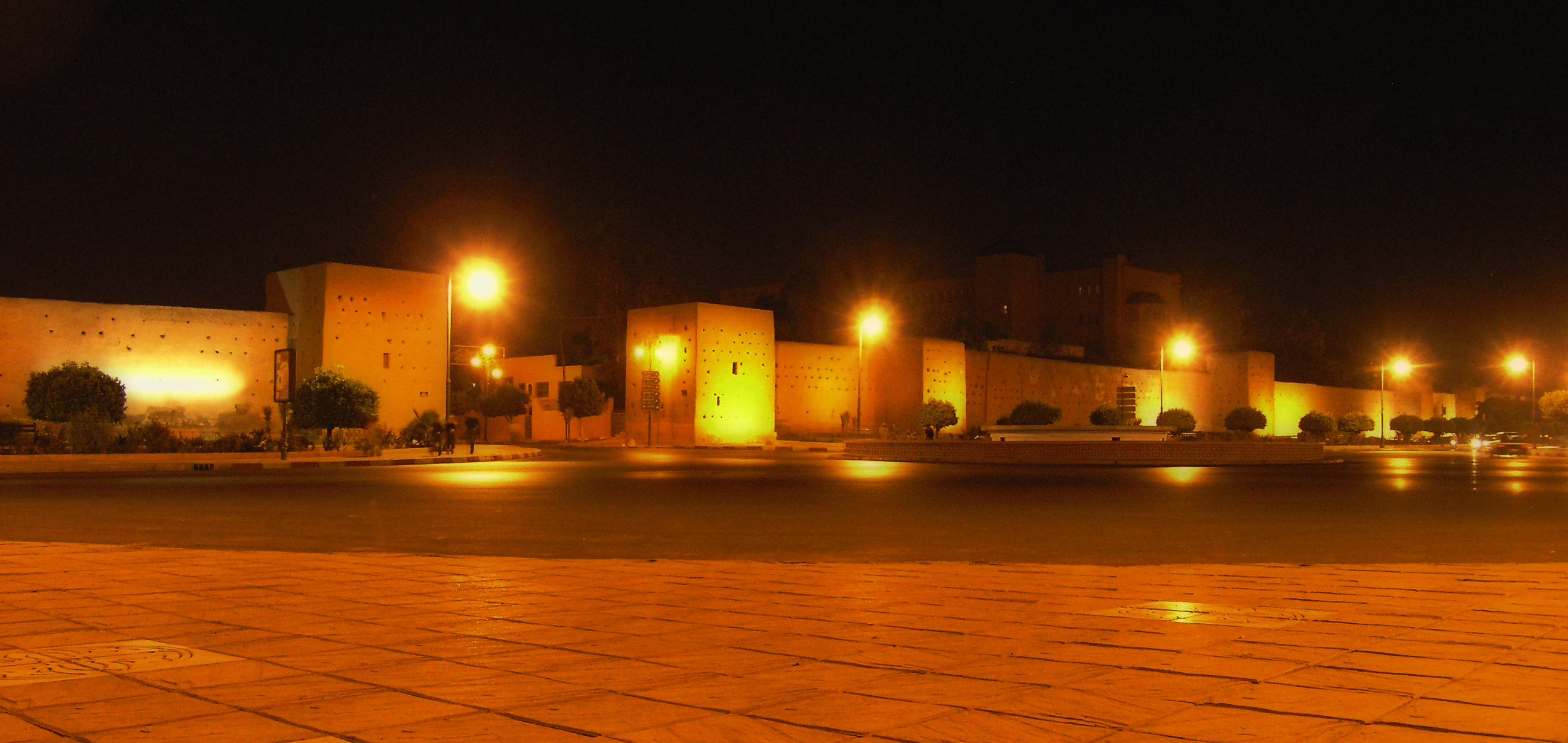
Marrakech ramparts by night

The ramparts of Marrakesh, which stretch for some 19 kilometres (12 mi) around the medina of the city, were built by the Almoravids in the 12th century as protective fortifications. The walls are made of a distinct orange-red clay and chalk, giving the city its nickname as the "red city"; they stand up to 19 feet (5.8 m) high and have 20 gates and 200 towers along them.

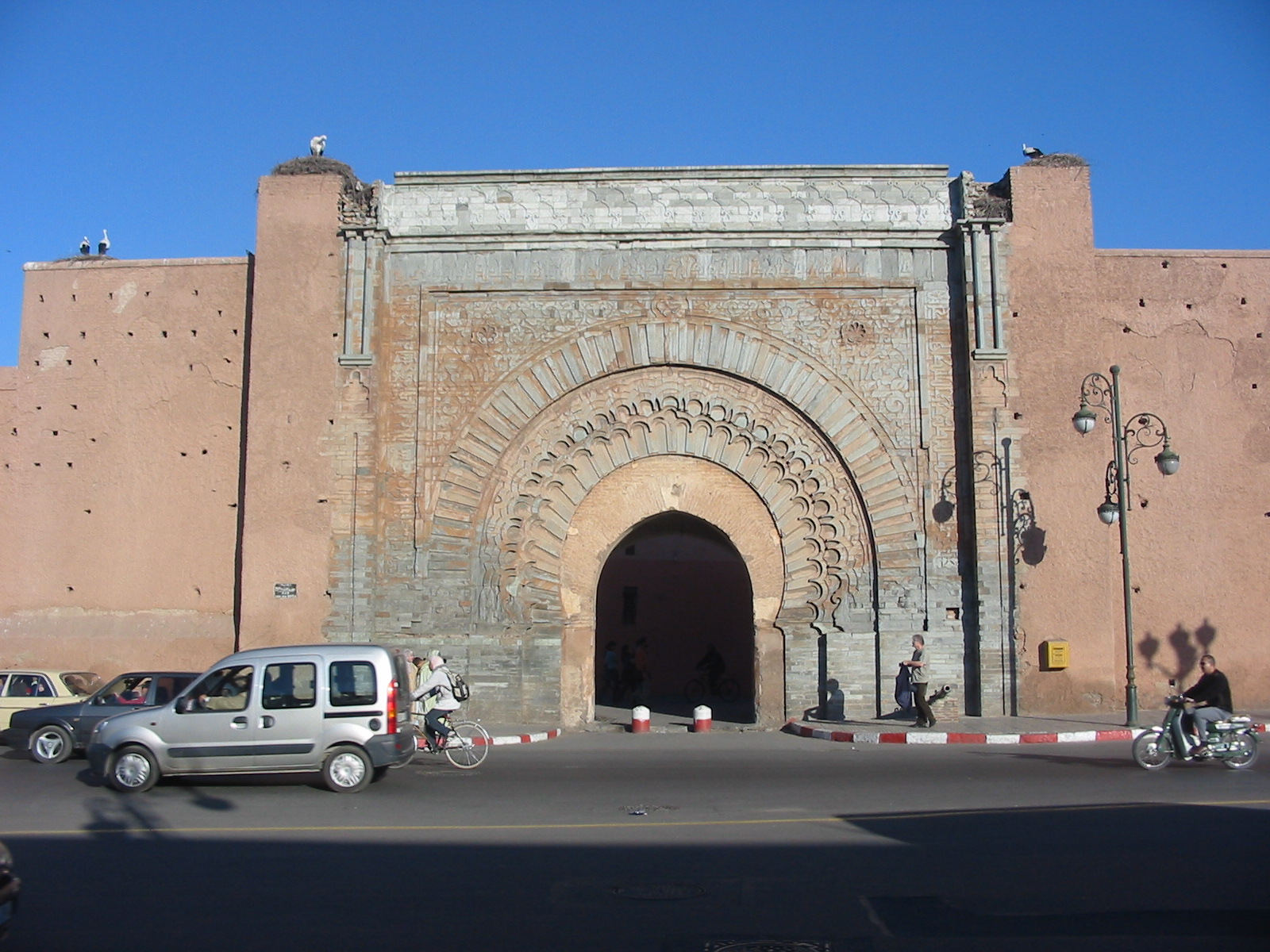
Bab Agnaou

Of the city's gates, one of the best-known is Bab Agnaou, built in the late 12th century by the Almohad caliph Ya'qub al-Mansur as the main public entrance to the new Kasbah. The Berber name Agnaou, like Gnaoua, refers to people of Sub-Saharan African origin (cf. Akal-n-iguinawen – land of the black). The gate was called Bab al Kohl (the word kohl also meaning "black") or Bab al Qsar (palace gate) in some historical sources. The corner-pieces are embellished with floral decorations. This ornamentation is framed by three panels marked with an inscription from the Quran in Maghrebi script using foliated Kufic letters, which were also used in Al-Andalus. Bab Agnaou was renovated and its opening reduced in size during the rule of sultan Mohammed ben Abdallah.

The medina has at least eight main historic gates: Bab Doukkala, Bab el-Khemis, Bab ad-Debbagh, Bab Aylan, Bab Aghmat, Bab er-Robb, Bab el-Makhzen and Bab el-'Arissa. These date back to the 12th century during the Almoravid period but many of them have been modified since. Bab Doukkala (in the northwestern part of the city wall) is in general more massive but less ornamented than the other gates; it takes its name from Doukkala area on the Atlantic coast, well to the north of Marrakesh. Bab el-Khemis is in the medina's northeastern corner and is named for the open-air Thursday market (Souq el Khemis). It is one of the city's main gates and features a man-made spring. Bab ad-Debbagh, to the east, has one of the most complex layouts of any gate, with an interior passage that turns multiple times. Bab Aylan is located slightly further south of it. Bab Aghmat is one of the city's main southern gates, located east of the Jewish and Muslim cemeteries and near the tomb of Ali ibn Yusuf. Bab er Robb is the other main southern exit from the city, located near Bab Agnaou. It has a curious position and layout which may be the result of multiple modifications to the surrounding area over the years.

== Gardens ==
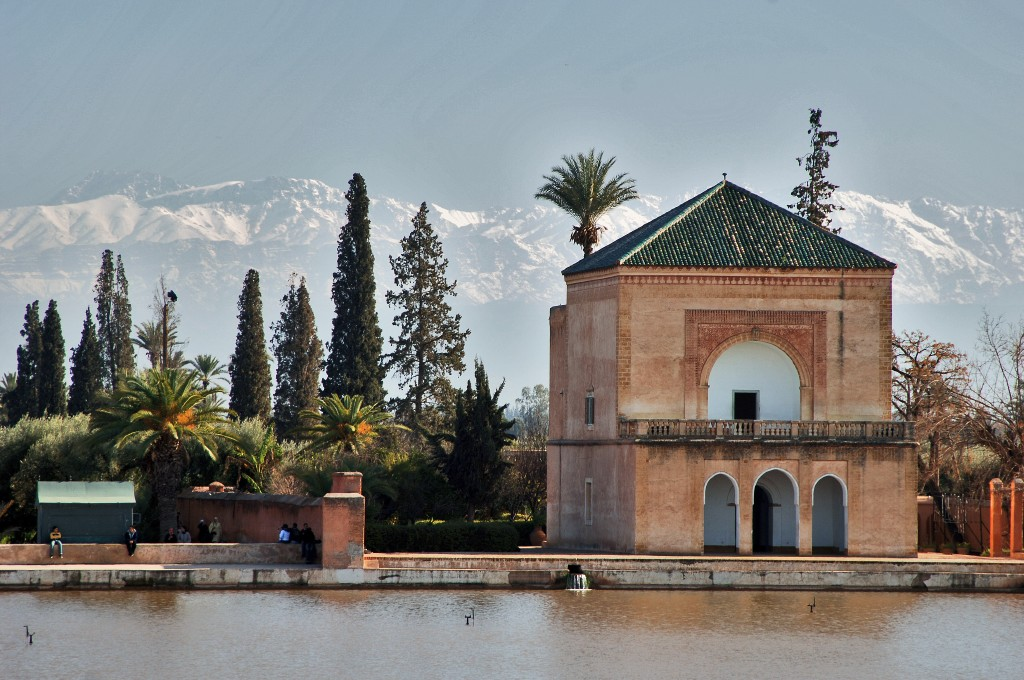
Saadian garden pavilion of the Menara gardens

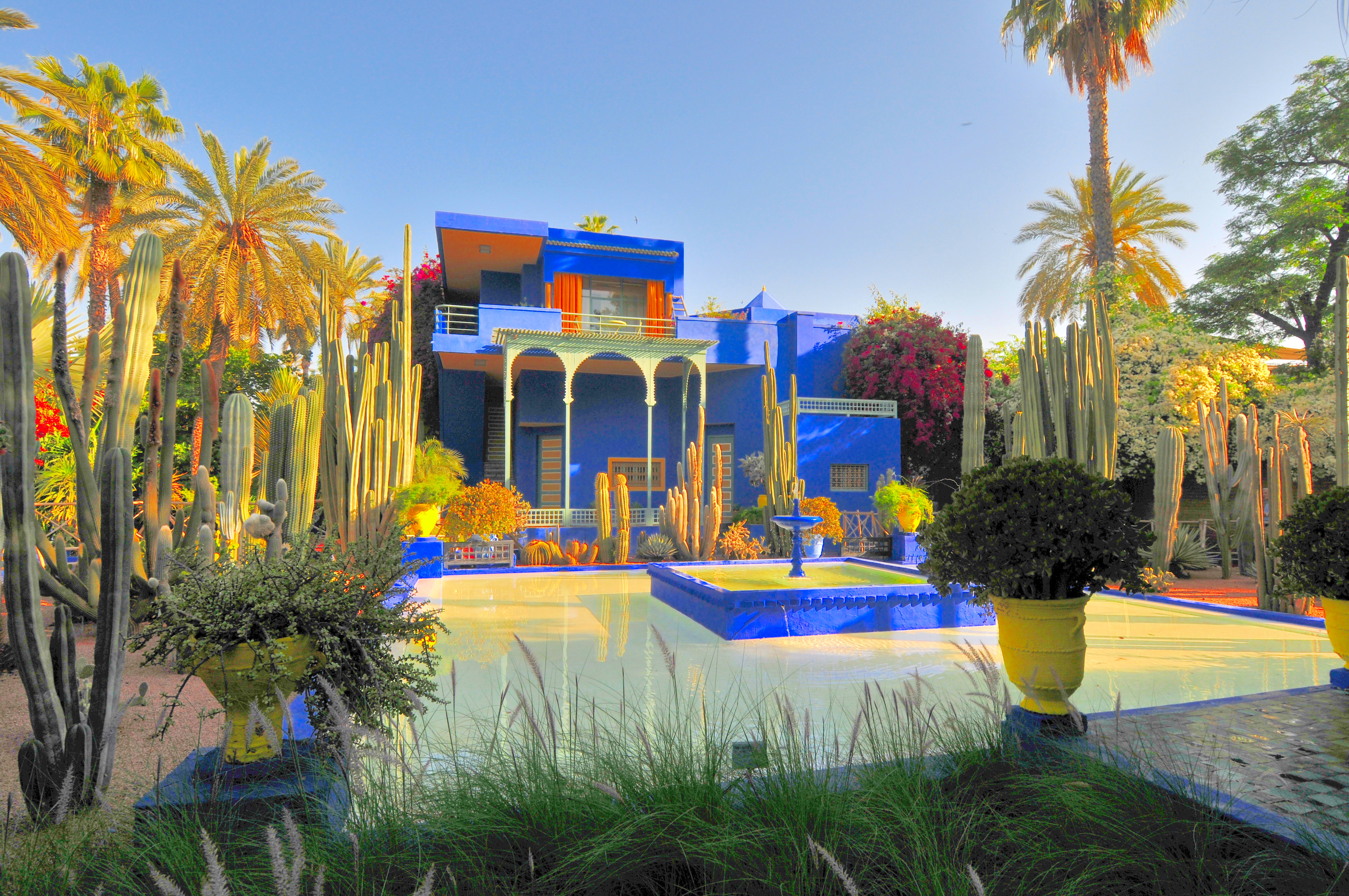
The Berber museum, painted in Majorelle Blue, at the Majorelle Garden.

=== Menara Gardens ===
The Menara Gardens are a garden-orchard located to the west of the old city, centered around a large water reservoir. The reservoir and gardens were originally created in the 12th century by the Almohad ruler Abd al-Mu'min, but were restored and replanted in later centuries. The iconic pavilion structure at the edge of the lake, often pictured against the backdrop of the Atlas Mountains to the south, dates from 1870 under the reign of Sultan Muhammad IV, although an earlier Saadian pavilion is believed to have existed on the same site before. The orchards, irrigated and watered with the help of the reservoir, are planted with olive trees and fruit trees. Water was tapped from the mountains to the south and brought to the gardens (and to the rest of the city) via a network of underground channels known as khettaras. There is also a small modern amphitheater on the edge of the reservoir. Carp fish can be seen in the pond.

=== Agdal Gardens ===
The Agdal Gardens are a vast garden and orchard covering 340 hectares to the south of the historic city. Also created in the 12th century, they are enclosed with a circuit of pisé (rammed earth) walls and connected to the Kasbah of the city and the Royal Palace. They contain two large water reservoirs amidst orchards planted with olive trees, orange trees, and various other fruit trees. The largest reservoir, the Dar al-Hana reservoir, is overlooked by a modern palatial pavilion, though multiple earlier pavilions and palaces existed on the same site in earlier centuries. Another palace complex, the Dar al-Bayda, was built further north during the 19th century, and various other pools, pavilions, and industrial structures were built in various parts of the gardens by Alaouite sultans.

=== Majorelle Garden ===
The Majorelle Garden, on Av Yacoub el Mansour, was at one time the home of the landscape painter, Jacques Majorelle. The designer, Yves Saint Laurent, bought and restored the property, which features a stele erected in his memory, and the Berber Museum, which is housed in a dark blue building. The garden, open to the public since 1947, has a large collection of plants and “floral exotica” (acquired since the 1920s) of five Continents. All the plants have descriptive signs and the commonly seen plants are cacti, palms and bamboo. It is very well laid out with pools with lilies, and pathways.

=== Other Gardens ===
The Koutoubia Gardens are situated behind the Koutoubia Mosque; it features orange and palm trees, and is frequented by storks. The Mamounia Gardens, more than 100 years old, named after Prince Moulay Mamoun, has olive and orange trees, with flower beds and different kinds of flora.

Others include Annakhil: Palm Grove, Aarssat Elhamed, Aarssat Moulay Abdessalam, Aarssat Elbilk, Ghabat Achabab, and Bab Errab Garden.

== Palaces and riads ==
=== Royal Palace (Dar al-Makhzen) ===
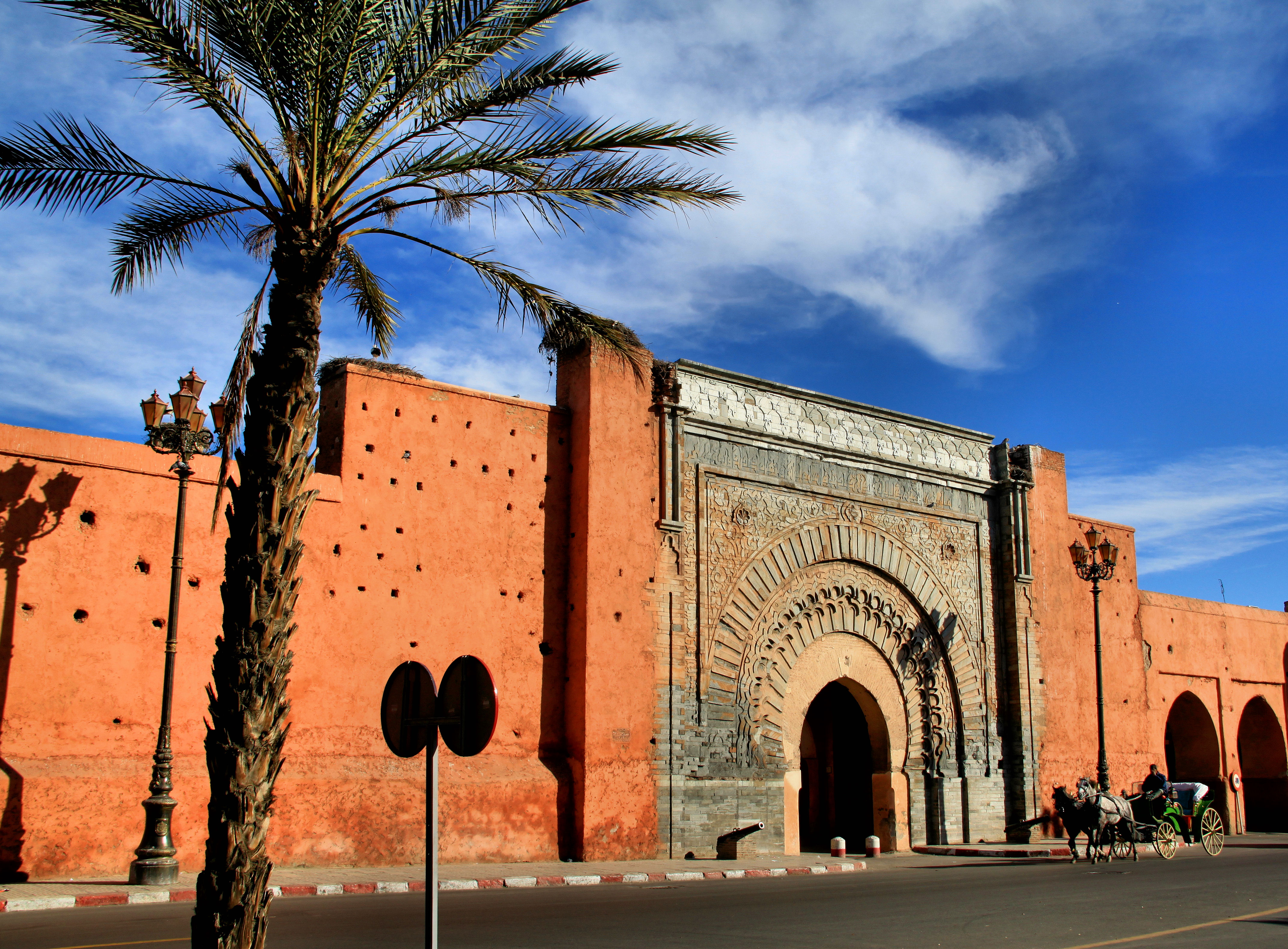
Bab Agnaou, the historical main gate of Marrakesh's kasbah

The Royal Palace of Marrakesh, also known as Dar el-Makhzen, is located at the southern end of the city, occupying most of the eastern section of the present-day Kasbah quarter. The Almohads first built a palace complex on this site in the 12th century, as part of their newly built kasbah, but it was completely remodeled by the Saadians in the 16th century and the Alaouites after the 17th century. Much of its current form has been dated to the 18th century under the reign of Mohammed Ben Abdallah. The Alaouite palace today consists of several grand gardens and courtyards surrounded by various chambers and pavilions. The palace's main entrance today is to the south, approached via a series of mechouars (walled squares) and gates. One visitor in the mid-1980s described a reception room which was "filled with Grand Concourse-repro Victorian settees covered in white-and-gold brocade". The palace is still in use by the King of Morocco and is not open to the public.

=== Badi Palace ===
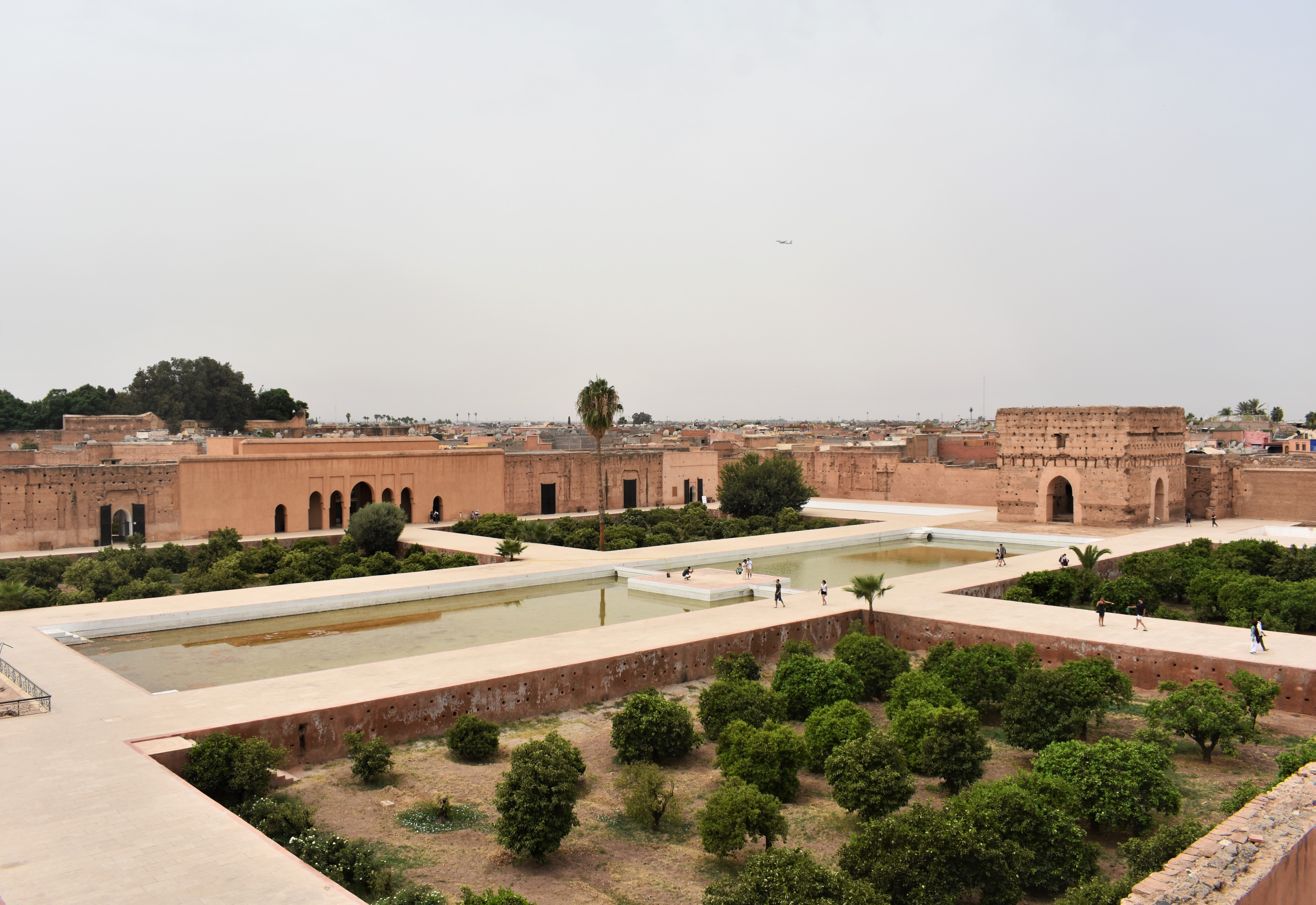
El Badi Palace

The El Badi Palace is located north of the Royal Palace and was originally part of the Saadian-era palace complex. It was built by Saadian Ahmad al-Mansur after his success against the Portuguese at the Battle of the Three Kings in 1578. The lavish palace was intended to receive and impress the sultan's guests.

It took around a quarter of a century to build and was funded by the ransoms paid by captured Portuguese nobility, by sugar cane revenues, and by the profits of the trans-Saharan trade routes which Al-Mansur conquered during his reign. This allowed Carrara marble to be imported from Italy, other materials coming from France, Spain and even India. Its layout, with two monumental pavilions facing each other across a symmetrical courtyard, reflects the traditional Andalusian/Moorish layout seen in the smaller Court of the Lions at the Alhambra. After the end of the Saadian dynasty in the 17th century the palace fell into neglect and was then systematically looted by the Alaouite sultan Moulay Isma'il for its valuable materials like marble. The preserved ruins of the palace are open today as a tourist attraction. The Marrakech Folklore Festival is held in the spring at the palace.

=== Bahia Palace ===
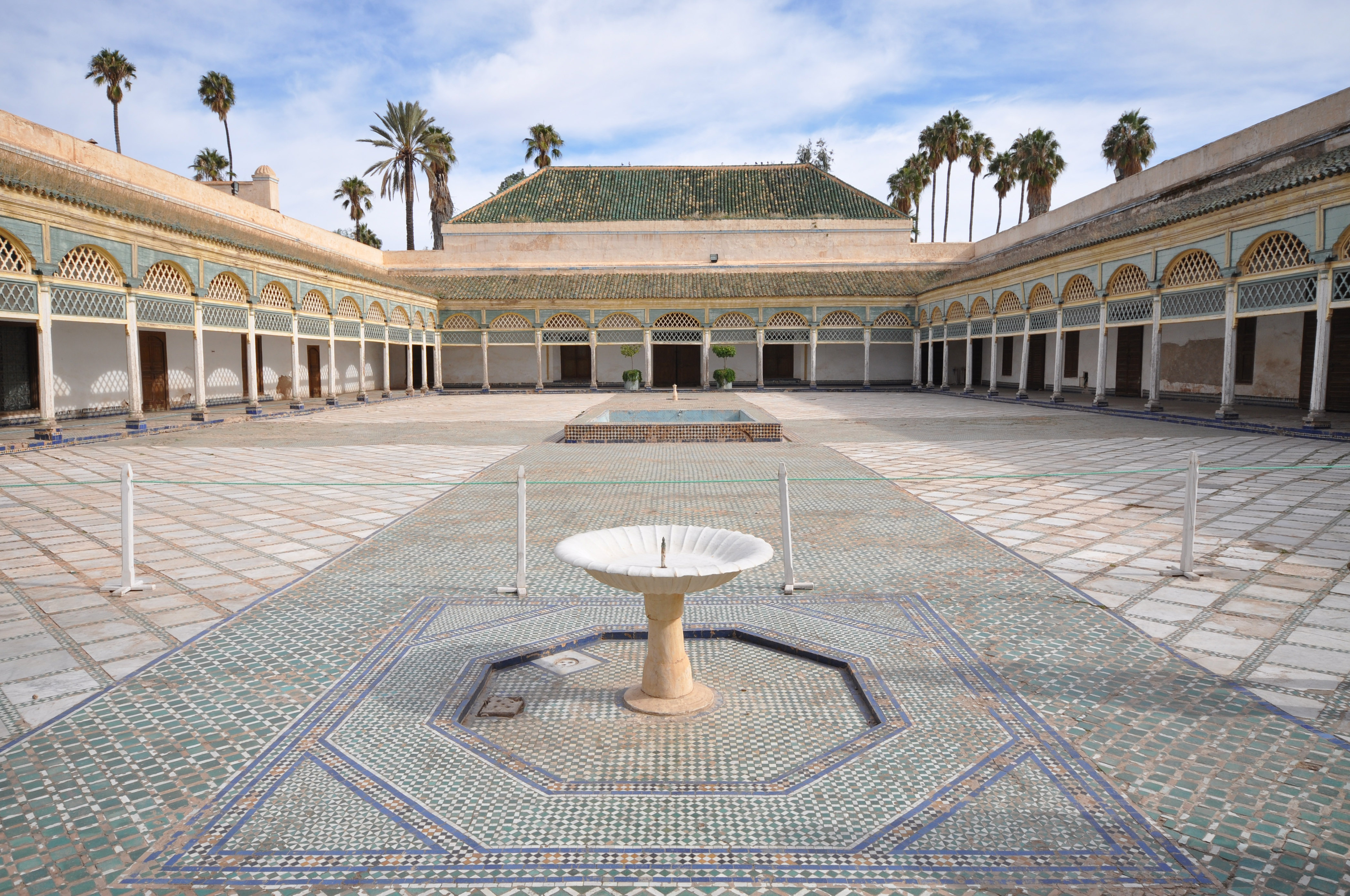
Grand courtyard of the Bahia Palace

The Bahia Palace was built in the late 19th century by the Grand Vizier Si Musa and his son, Ba Ahmed. Ba Ahmed resided here with his four wives, 24 concubines and many children. With a name meaning "brilliance", it was intended to be the greatest palace of its time and, as in similar developments of the period in other countries, it was designed to capture the essence of the Islamic and Moroccan style. Ba Ahmed paid special attention to the privacy of the palace in its construction and employed architectural features such as multiple doors which prevented unwelcome views of the interior. Ba Ahmed added to the palace throughout his seven years in office, with hundreds of craftsmen from Fes working on its wood, stucco and zellij decoration. The palace acquired a reputation as one of the finest in Morocco and was the envy of other wealthy citizens. It included multiple facilities such as a hammam (bathhouse), stables, and even its own mosque. To the east was a vast park and garden area which could be reached from the palace by a bridge over the nearby street. Upon the death of Ba Ahmed, the palace was raided by Sultan Abdel Aziz and seized by the state. Today the palace is still occasionally used by the state to receive foreign dignitaries, but is otherwise open to the public as a tourist attraction.

=== Other palaces ===
Numerous palaces built by the wealthy and by political elites in the 19th century and early 20th century have been preserved in the city. Several have been converted into museums today, such as Dar Mnebhi (now the Marrakesh Museum), Dar Si Said, and Dar el Basha. Another example, Dar Moulay Ali, houses the French consulate. Like the Bahia Palace, they exemplify the luxurious palace architecture typical of this period, employing traditional Moroccan ornamentation while sometimes blending minor but notable European influences that began to take hold in the late 19th century. In addition to residential quarters and reception halls, they often also contained facilities such as kitchens and a hammam.

=== Traditional houses and riads ===
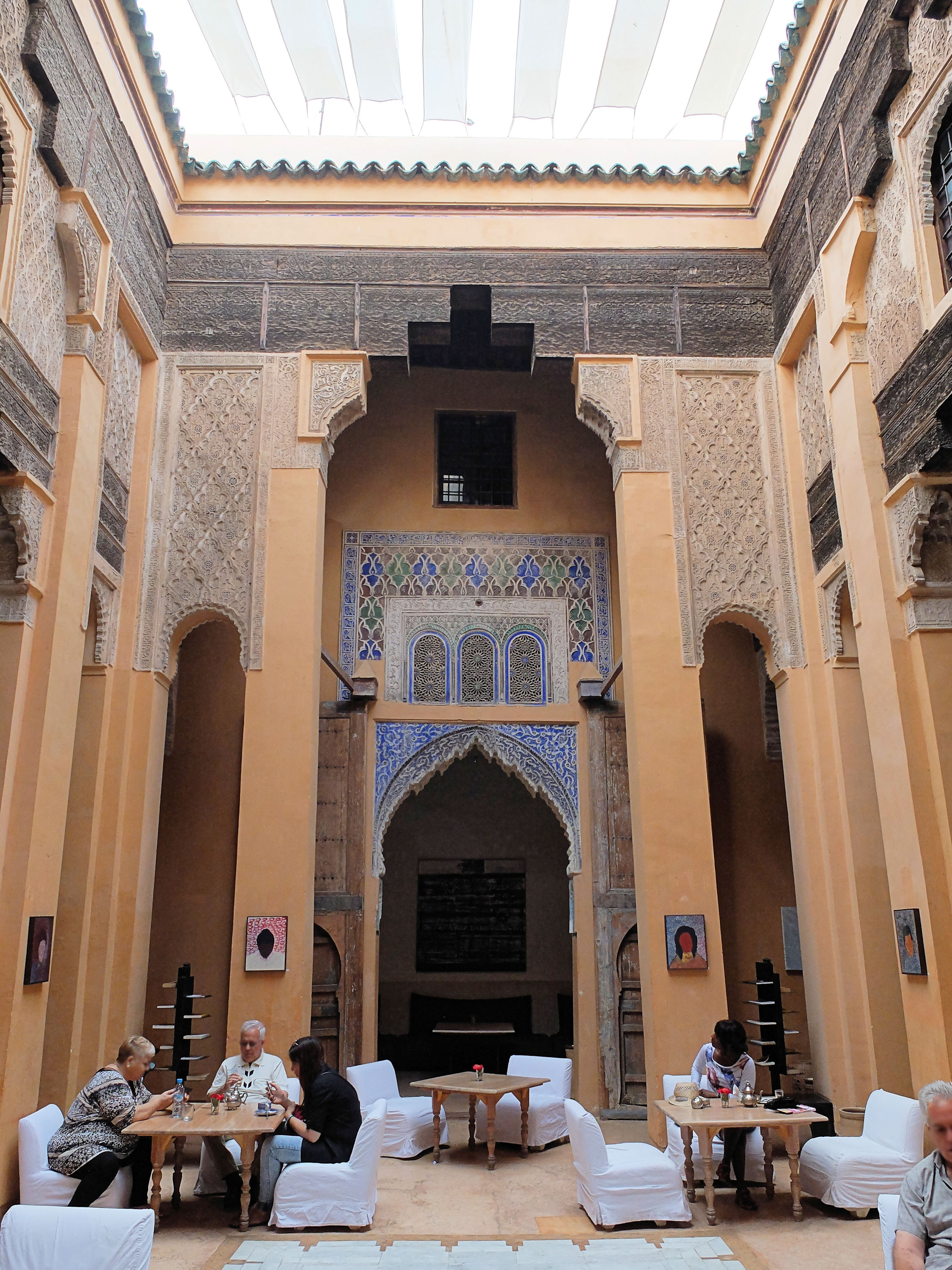
Dar Cherifa, a 16th-century (Saadian-era) restored house

Moroccan houses were traditionally inward focused, which allowed for family privacy and protection from the weather. This inward focus was expressed with a centrally placed interior garden or courtyard, and the lack of large windows on the exterior walls, which were built of rammed earth or mud brick. This design principle also found support in the social mores of Islamic society, which placed great value on privacy and encouraged a separation between private family spaces (where women notably lived and worked) and semi-public spaces where outside guests were received. The walls of traditional houses, if the owners had enough means, could also be adorned with characteristic stucco decoration and zellij tiles, and sometimes with Arabic calligraphy. Many richly decorated mansions built by wealthy or bourgeois Moroccan families have survived in various states of preservation. The oldest examples in Marrakesh date to the Saadian period (16th-17th centuries), such as the Dar Cherifa (formerly known as Dar Ijimi), the Dar al-Mas'udiyyin, and the Dar al-Masluhiyyin (known also as Ksour Agafay). The Mouassine Museum also contains an example of preserved Saadian-era douiria, or upper-floor guest apartment.

The term "riad" or "riyad" (from Arabic: رياض) refers to a common type of interior garden, in particular one that is symmetrically divided into four parts along its central axes and typically has a fountain at its middle. Interior gardens were a popular feature of palace architecture in the Islamic world because water and greenery were associated with images of paradise in Islam. The earliest known example of a true riad garden (with a symmetrical four-part division) in Morocco was found in the Almoravid palace built by Ali ibn Yusuf in Marrakesh in the early 12th century. This model of interior design became particularly successful and common in Marrakesh thanks to the combination of warm climate and available space, making it well-suited to the architecture of the wealthy mansions and palaces built throughout the city's history. The central gardens of traditional riads were often planted with fruit trees such as orange trees or lemon trees.

In recent years the term "riad" has come to be associated with traditional Moroccan houses (usually restored) that have been converted to hotels and guesthouses. Marrakesh was the early epicenter of riad renovations and the booming tourist industry in the 21st century has fueled an ever-growing number of such examples in and around the old medina.

== Places of worship ==
=== Mosques ===
==== Koutoubia Mosque ====
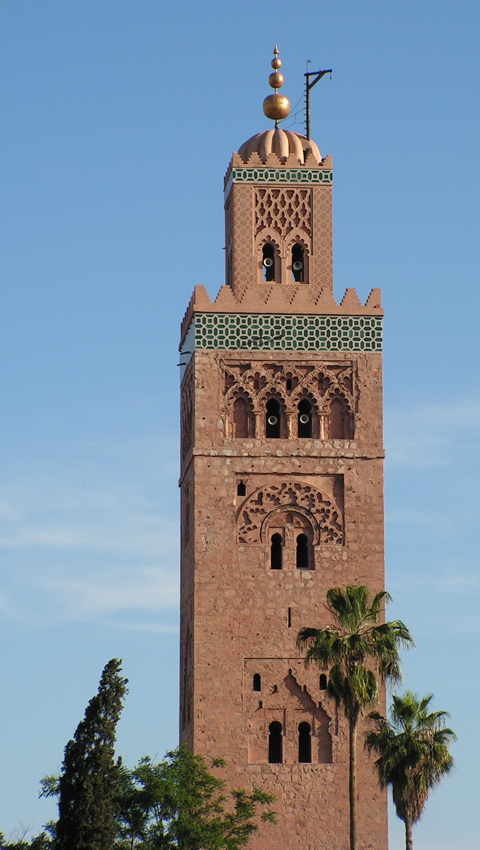
Minaret of the Koutoubia Mosque

Koutoubia Mosque, also known as Kutubiyya Mosque, Jami' al-Kutubiyah, Kutubiyyin Mosque, and Mosque of the Booksellers, is the largest mosque in the city, located in the southwest of Jemaa el-Fna square. The minaret, 77 metres (253 ft) in height, includes a spire and orbs. It was founded by the Almohad Caliph Abd al-Mu'min in 1147, then completely rebuilt shortly after, and probably completed in its current form by Yaqub al-Mansur in 1195. The mosque is made of red stone and brick in a traditional Almohad style, and measures 80 metres (260 ft) in width towards the east and 60 metres (200 ft) to the west along a north to south direction. It was designed so as to prevent anyone gazing in from the minaret to the harems of the king. There are four entrances to the mosque, of which three open directly into the prayer hall. There are six interior rooms, one above the other. The prayer hall is a hypostyle with more than 100 columns which support horseshoe-shaped arches along the parallel naves. The minaret, constructed of sandstone, is one of the most famous in the western Islamic world along with the contemporary Giralda of Seville and the Hassan Tower of Rabat. It was originally covered with Marrakshi pink plaster, but in the 1990s, experts opted to expose the original stone work and removed the plaster. The spire includes gilded copper balls, decreasing in size towards the top, a traditional style of Morocco.

==== Ben Youssef Mosque ====
Located in the medina with a green tiled roof and a minaret, Ben Youssef Mosque (also Bin Yusuf Mosque) is the oldest mosque in the city. It was originally built in the 12th century by the Almoravid Sultan Ali ibn Yusuf, whom it is named after. It served as the city's main Friday mosque. After being abandoned during the Almohad period and falling into ruin, it was rebuilt in the 1560s by the Saadian sultan Abdallah al-Ghalib and then completely rebuilt again by the Alaouite sultan Moulay Sliman at the beginning of the 19th century, with construction of the minaret finishing in 1819 or 1820. This reconstruction has eliminated all traces of the original mosque, and the current mosque is much smaller than the original and features a very different qibla orientation. Abdallah al-Ghalib was also responsible for building the adjacent Ben Youssef Madrasa, which contained a library and operated as an educational institution up until the 20th century.

===== Almoravid Koubba =====
The Koubba Ba’adiyin, also known as Koubba el Barudiyyin or Qubbat el-Murabitin ("Almoravid Koubba"), is a two storied ablutions kiosk which was discovered in 1948 from a sunken location on the mosque site. It demonstrates a sophisticated style and is an important piece of historical Moroccan architecture. It consists of a double storied structure with arches, scalloped on the ground floor and twin horseshoe shaped in the first floor, combined with a turbaned motif. The dome is framed with a battlement decorated with arches and seven pointed stars. The interior of the octagonal arched dome is decorated with very distinguishing carvings bordered by a Kufic freeze inscribed with the name of the creator, Al ben Youssef. The squinches at the corner of the dome are covered with muqarnas. The kiosk has motifs of pine cones, palms and acanthus leaves which are also replicated in the Ben Youssef Madrasa.

==== Kasbah Mosque ====
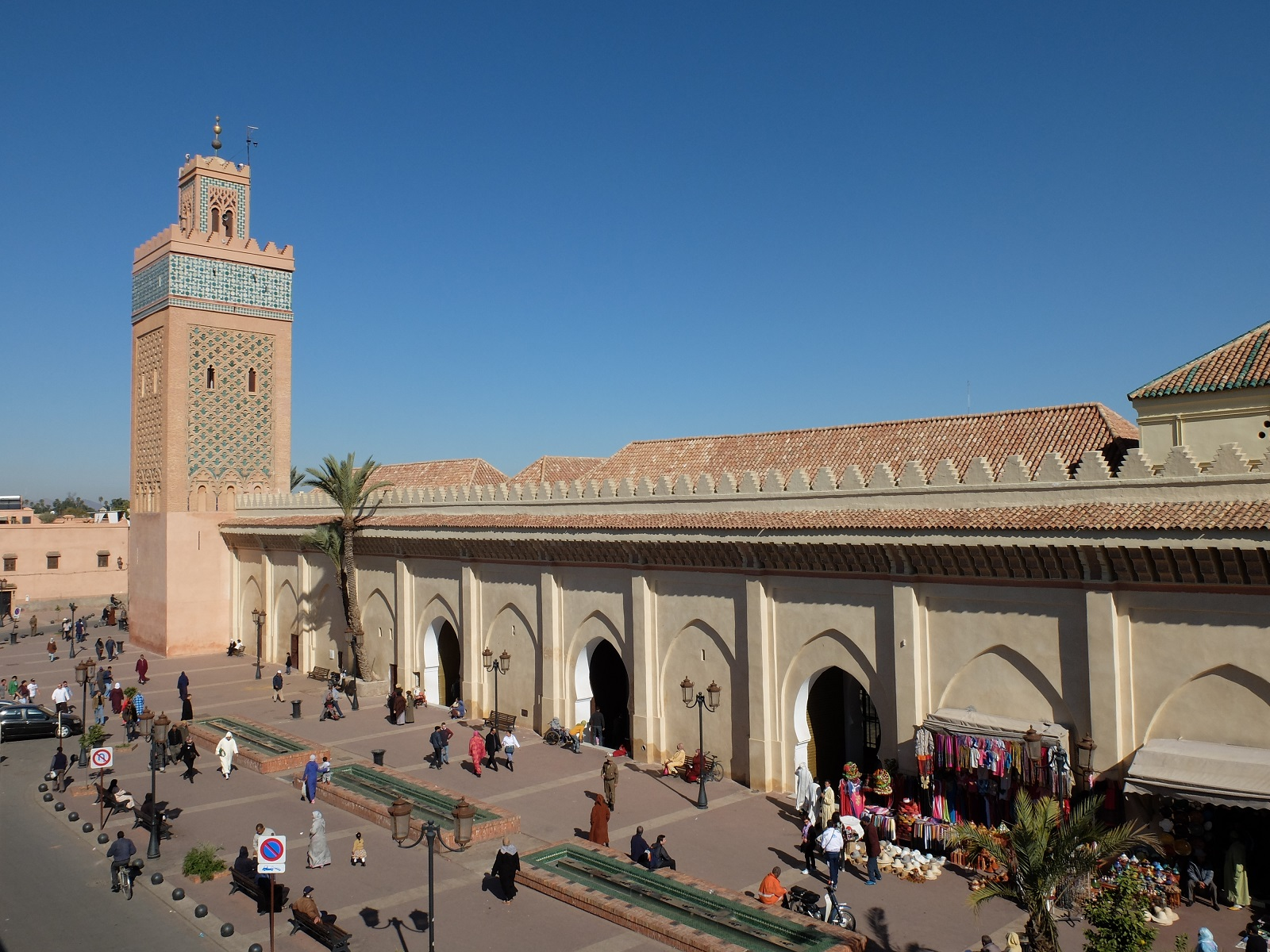
The Kasbah Mosque (also known as the Moulay al-Yazid Mosque)

The Kasbah Mosque overlooks Place Moulay Yazid in the Kasbah district of Marrakesh, close to the El Badi Palace. It was built by the Almohad caliph Yaqub al-Mansour in the late 12th century to serve as the Friday mosque of the Kasbah (citadel) where he and his high officials resided. It features a unique floor plan and courtyard layout that sets it apart from other classic Moroccan mosques. It contended with the Koutoubia Mosque for prestige and the decoration of its minaret was highly influential in subsequent Moroccan architecture. The mosque was repaired by the Saadi sultan Moulay Abd Allah al-Ghalib following a devastating explosion at a nearby gunpowder reserve in the second half of the 16th century. Notably, the Saadian Tombs were built just outside its qibla (southern) wall, and visitors pass behind the mosque to see them today.

==== Mouassine Mosque & Bab Doukkala Mosque ====
The Mouassine Mosque (also known as the Al Ashraf Mosque) was built by the Saadian Sultan Moulay Abdallah al-Ghalib between 1562–63 and 1572-73. It is located in the Mouassine district and is part of a larger architectural complex which includes a library, hammam (public bathhouse), madrasa (school) and a triple arched fountain known as the Mouassine Fountain. The fountain, which provided locals with access to water, is one of the largest and most important in the city, decorated with geometric patterns and Arabic inscriptions. Along with Bab Doukkala Mosque further west, which was built around the same time and has a very similar format, the Mouassine Mosque appears to have been originally designed to anchor the development of new neighbourhoods after the relocation of the Jewish district from this area to the new mellah near the Kasbah.

==== Other mosques ====
Other mosques include the Marinid-era Ben Salah Mosque, the Barrima Mosque, Zawiya of Sidi Bel Abbes, Zawiya of Sidi Ben Slimane al-Jazuli, Zawiya of Sidi Youssef Ben Ali, Sidi Moulay el-Ksour Mosque, (or Zawiya of Sidi Abdallah al-Ghazwani), the so-called Mosque of the Cat, and the Al-Wusta Mosque.

=== Synagogues ===
Synagogues include the Slat al-Azama Synagogue, the Beth-El Synagogue, Bitoun Synagogue, and Salat Rabi Pinhasse Synagogue.

=== Churches ===
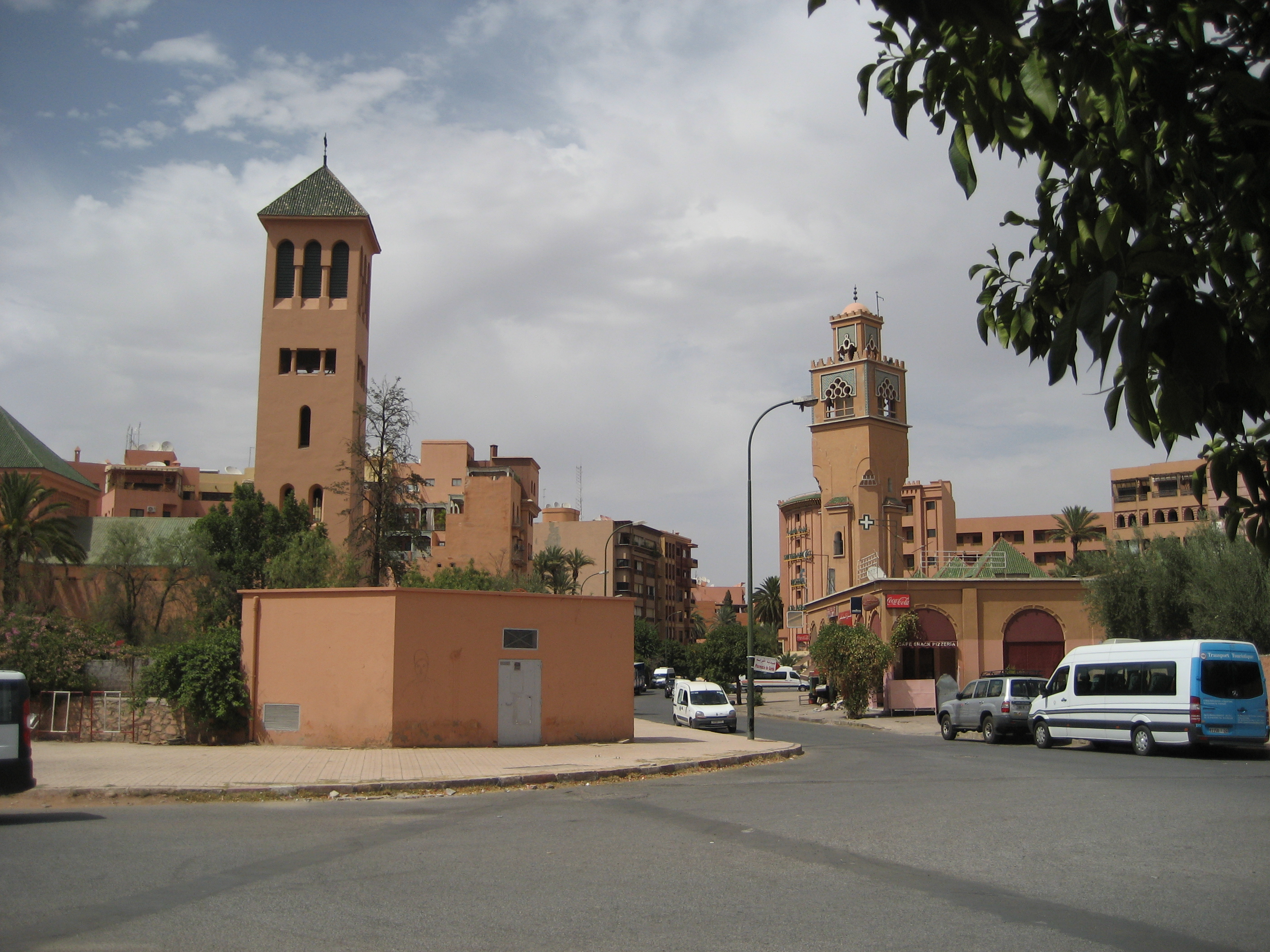
Church of the Holy Martyrs

The Church of the Holy Martyrs is a Catholic church located in the Guéliz district of Marrakech. It is the only catholic church in the city and is part of the Archdiocese of Rabat. Built in 1928 and consecrated in 1929, it is dedicated to the five Franciscan martyrs who were executed on the site in the 13th century. The church is still served by three Franciscan priests for the Christian community in Marrakech.

== Tombs and burial grounds ==
=== Saadian Tombs ===
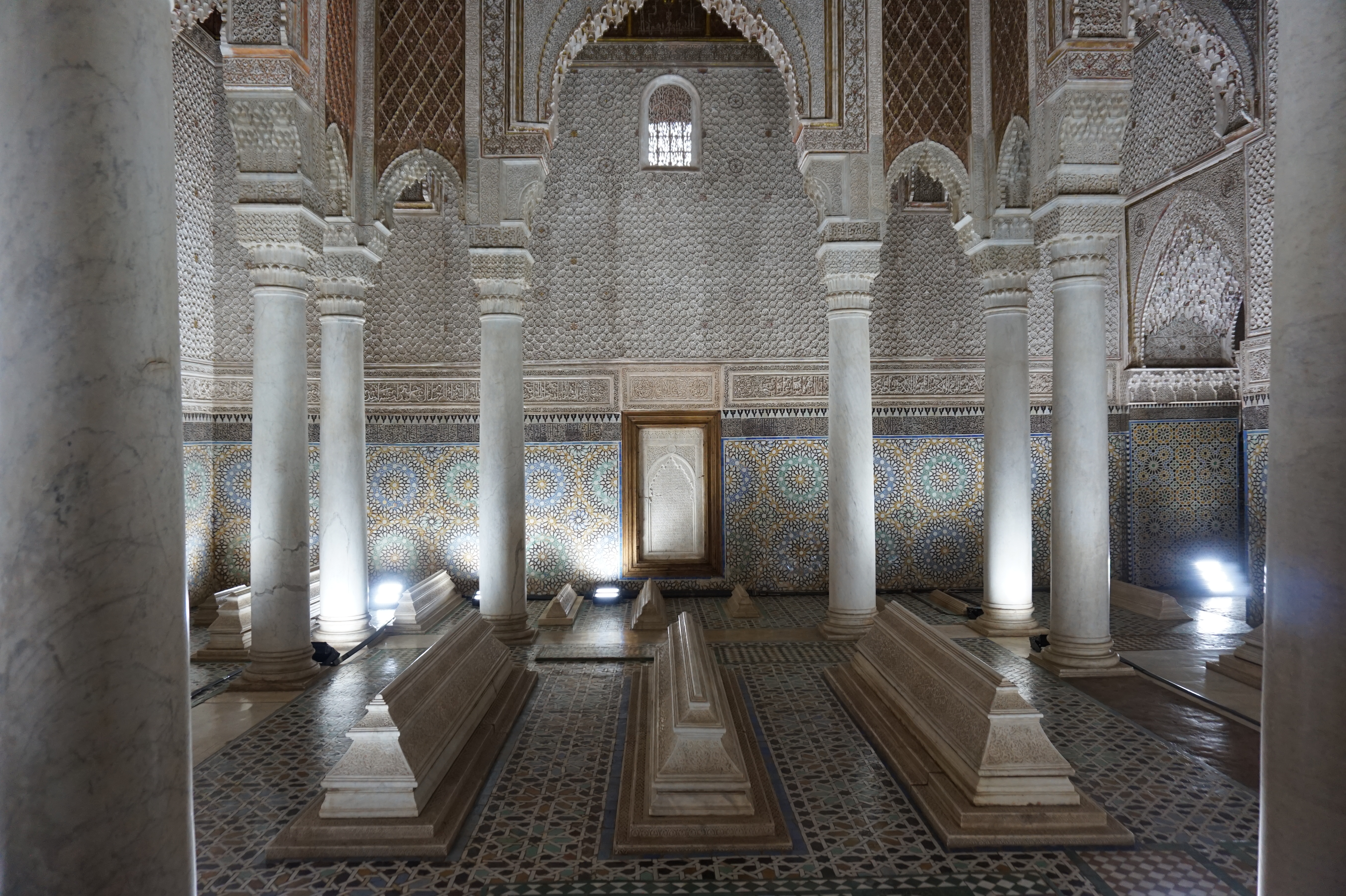
Saadian Tombs

The Saadian Tombs were built in the 16th century as a royal necropolis for the Saadian sultans and their family members. It is next to the south wall of the Kasbah Mosque. It was lost for many years until the French rediscovered it in 1917 using aerial photographs. The mausoleum comprises the remains of about sixty members of the Saadi Dynasty which originated in the valley of the Draa River. Among the tombs are those of Saadian sultan Ahmad al-Mansur and his family; al-Mansur buried his mother in this dynastic necropolis in 1590 after enlarging the original square funeral structure constructed by Abdallah al-Ghalib. His own mausoleum, richly embellished, was modeled on the Nasrid mausoleum in the Alhambra of Granada, Spain. It comprises a roof of carved and painted cedar wood supported on twelve columns of carrara marble, as well as walls covered in elaborate geometric patterns in zellij tilework, Arabic calligraphic inscriptions, and vegetal motifs in carved stucco. The chamber also contains the graves of his close family members and some of his successors, many of which are covered with horizontal tombstones of finely carved marble. His chamber is adjoined by two other rooms, the largest of which was originally a prayer room, equipped with a mihrab, which was later repurposed as a mausoleum for members of the Alaouite dynasty.

=== Tombs of the Seven Saints ===
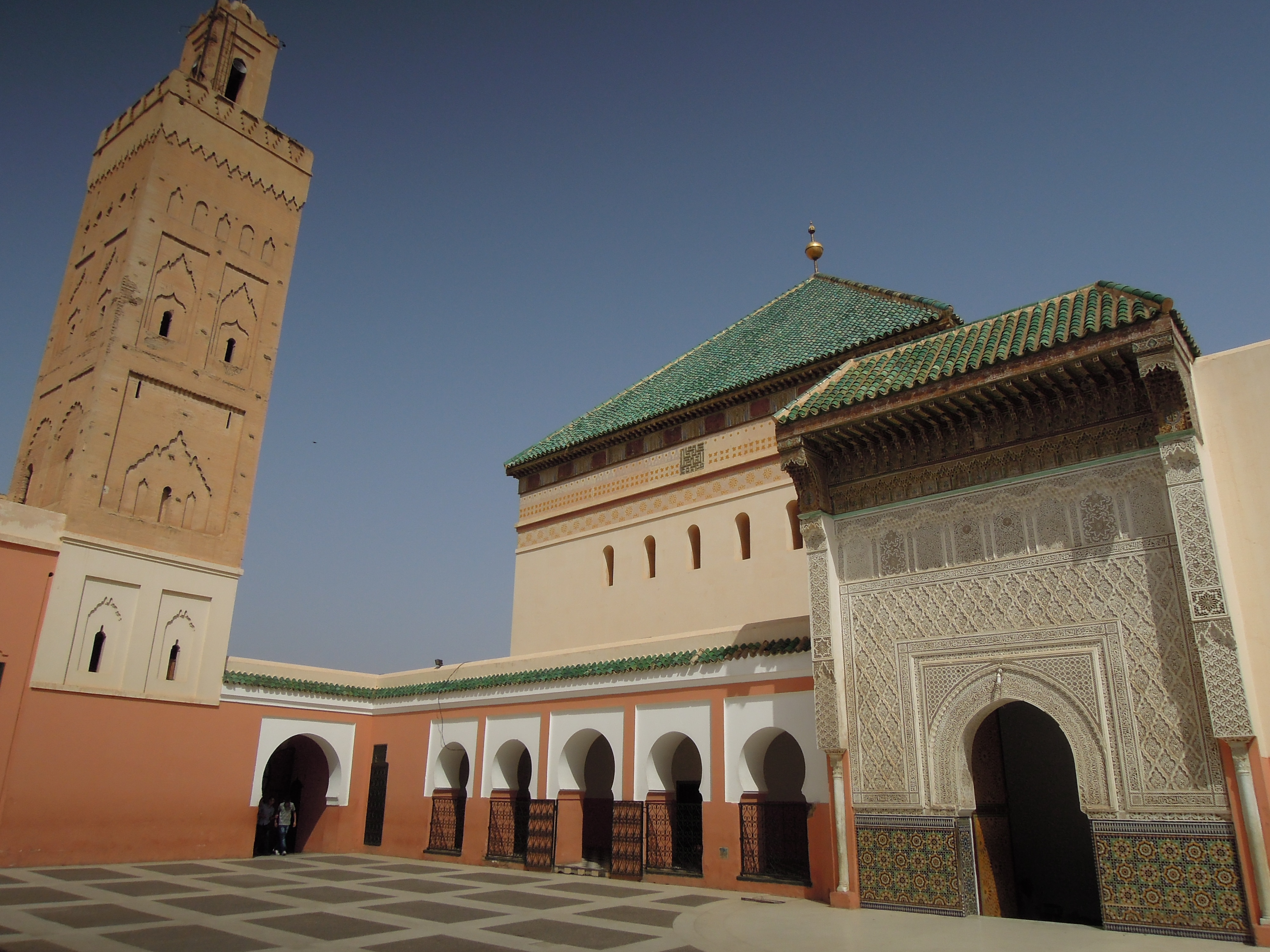
The Zawiya of Sidi Bel Abbes: a Sufi religious complex including a mausoleum, a mosque, and other facilities

Marrakesh is also known for the tombs of its "Seven Saints" or “Patron Saints of Marrakesh”, which are visited every year by pilgrims on successive days during a ziara (week-long pilgrimage). The tour of the Seven Saints' tombs follows the city's configuration rather than the chronological order in which they lived. The tour visits the tombs of the following men in order: Sidi Yusuf ibn Ali Sanhaji, Sidi al-Qadi Iyyad al-Yahsubi, Sidi Abul Abbas Sabti, Sidi Mohamed ibn Sulayman al-Jazouli, Sidi Abdellaziz Tabba'a, Sidi Abdellah al-Ghazwani, and lastly, the tomb of Sidi Abderrahman al-Suhayli. Many of these mausoleums also serve as the focus of their own zawiyas (Sufi religious complexes with mosques), including: the Zawiya and mosque of Sidi Bel Abbes (the most important of them), the Zawiya of al-Jazuli, the Zawiya of Sidi Abdellaziz, the Zawiya of Sidi Yusuf ibn Ali, and the Zawiya of Sidi al-Ghazwani (also known as Moulay el-Ksour).

=== Cemeteries ===
Like other medieval cities, most of Marrakesh's major cemeteries were located just outside the city walls, often near the city gates. These included the Cemetery of Bab el-Khemis, the Cemetery of Sidi al-Suhayli (which contained the later's mausoleum), and the very large Cemetery of Bab Aghmat. The Jewish Mellah also had its own cemetery known as the Miara Cemetery.

== Mellah ==
The mellah (old Jewish Quarter) is situated in the kasbah area of the city's medina, east of Place des Ferblantiers. It was created in 1558 by the Saadians at the site where the sultan's stables had previously been situated. At the time, the Jewish community consisted of a large portion of the city's bankers, jewelers, metalworkers, and tailors, and sugar traders. During the 16th century, the Mellah had its own fountains, gardens, synagogues, and souks. Up to the French arrival in 1912, Jews could not own property outside of the Mellah, so expansion occurred within its quarter, explaining the narrow streets, small shops, and higher placement of houses. The present Mellah, now named Hay Essalam, is smaller than the original one, and has an almost entirely Muslim population within its largely residential quarter. The Al-Azama Synagogue is built around a courtyard. The synagogue's ezrat nashim ("upstairs gallery") is an unusual feature as Moroccan women more often stay at a synagogue entrance or a different room. The blue-and-white building also contains a community center, Talmud Torah school, and soup kitchen. The Jewish cemetery, the largest Jewish cemetery in Morocco, characterized by white-washed tombs and sandy graves, is adjacent to the mellah, within the medina.

== Hotels ==
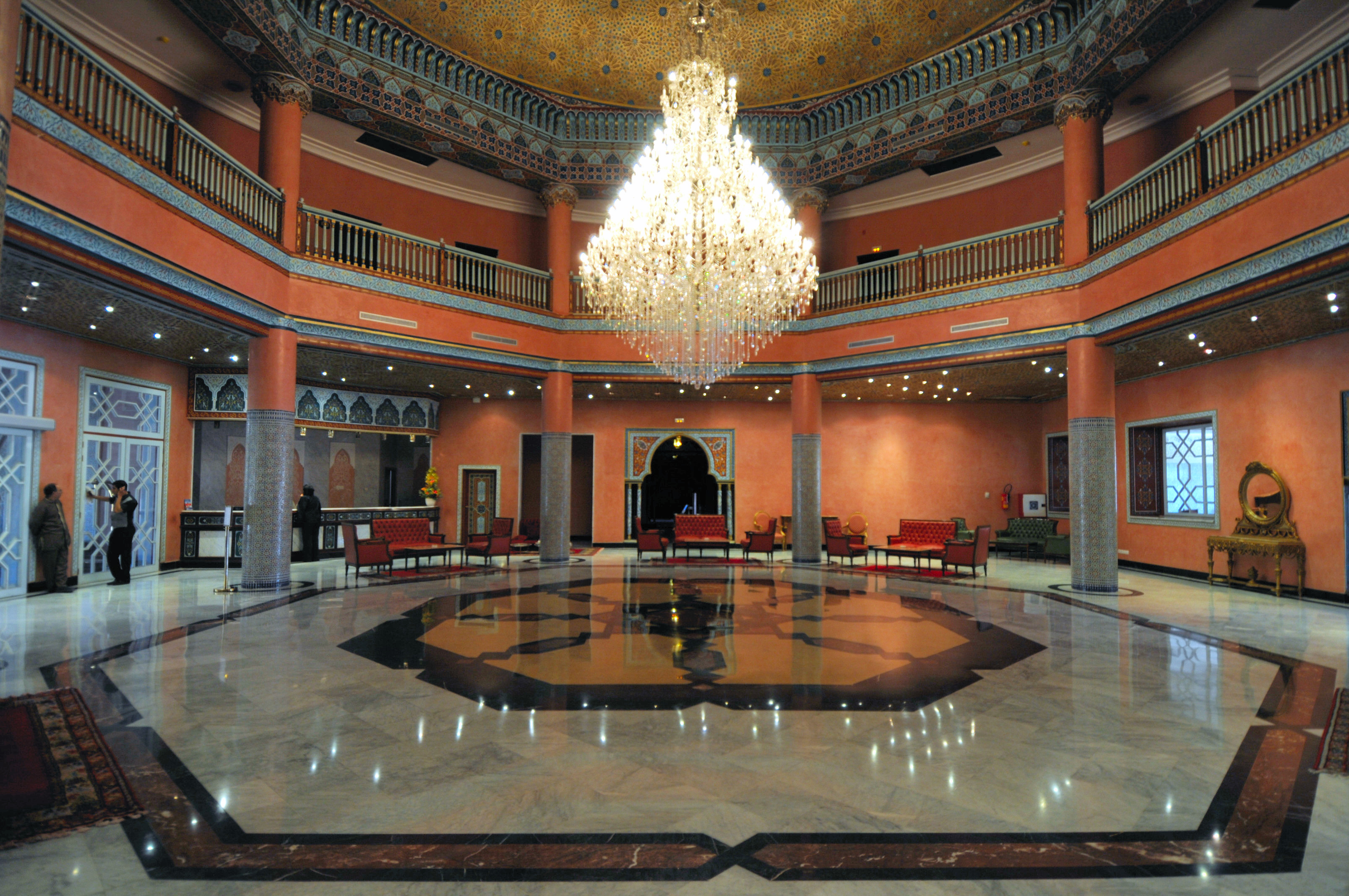
Hotel Marrakech

As one of the biggest tourist cities in Africa, Marrakech has over 400 hotels. La Mamounia, also known as Hôtel La Mamounia, is a 5-star hotel in the Art Deco-Moroccan fusion style, built in 1925 by Henri Prost and A. Marchis. It is considered the most eminent hotel of the city, cited as the "grand dame of Marrakesh hotels." The hotel has hosted numerous internationally renowned people including Winston Churchill, Charles, Prince of Wales and Mick Jagger. Churchill used to relax within the gardens of the hotel and paint there. The 231-room hotel, which contains a casino, was refurbished in 1986 and again in 2007 by French designer Jacques Garcia. Other hotels include Eden Andalou Hotel, Hotel Marrakech, Sofitel Marrakech, Royal Mirage Hotel, Piscina del Hotel, and in 2020 Rotana Hotels entered Morocco with the management of Marrakech’s iconic five-star Palmeraie Resort and its three hotels. In March 2012, Accor opened its first Pullman-branded hotel in Marrakech, Pullman Marrakech Palmeraie Resort & Spa. Set in a 17 hectare olive grove at La Palmeraie, the hotel has 252 rooms, 16 suites, six restaurants and a 535 square metres (5,760 sq ft) congress room.

== Museums ==
=== Marrakech Museum ===
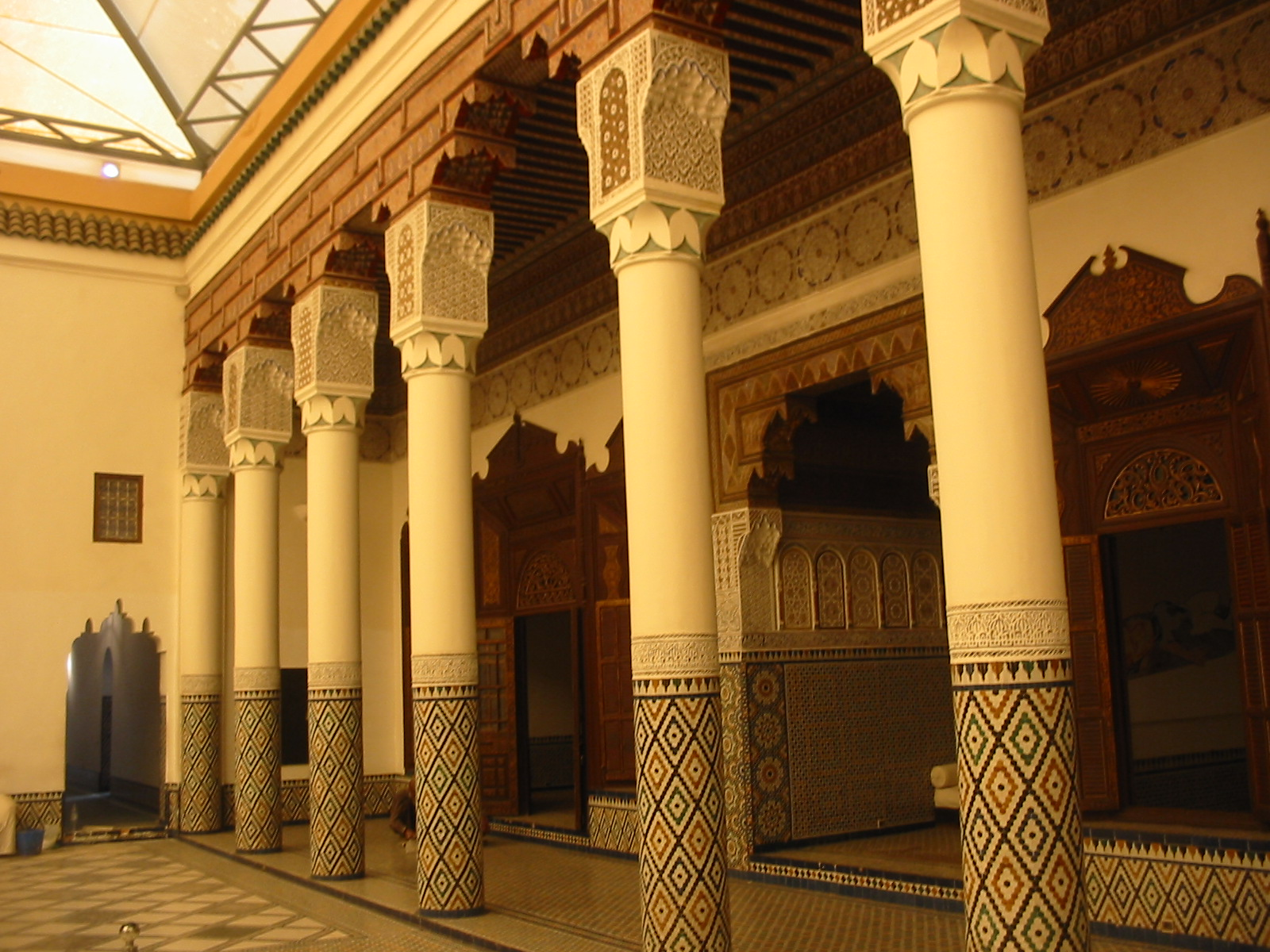
Marrakech Museum

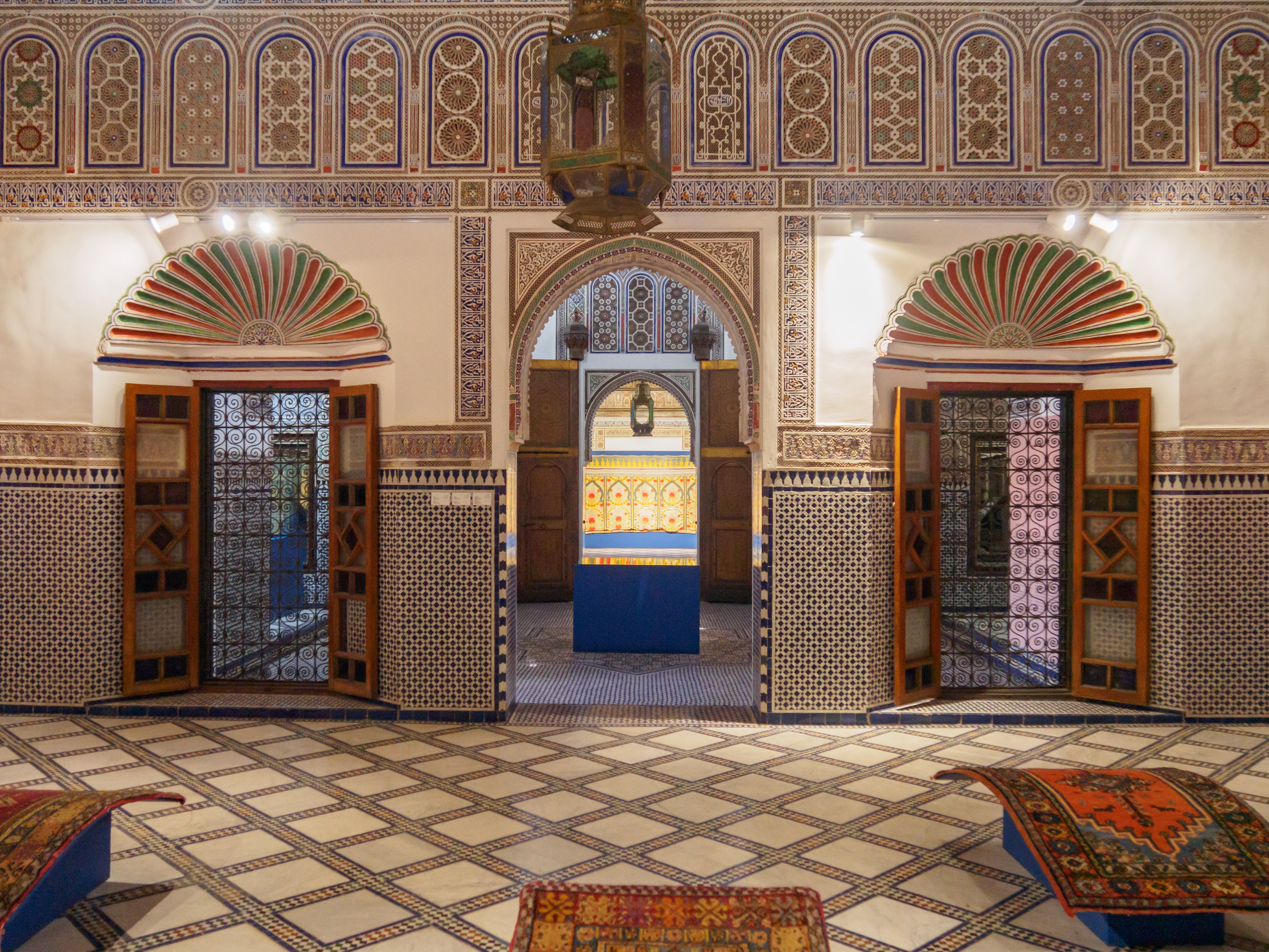
Dar Si Said Museum

The Marrakech Museum is located in the old centre, housed in the Dar Menebhi Palace, built at the beginning of the 20th century by Mehdi Menebhi. The palace was carefully restored by the Omar Benjelloun Foundation and converted into a museum in 1997. The house itself represents an example of classical Andalusian architecture, with fountains in the central courtyard, traditional seating areas, a hammam and intricate tilework and carvings. It has been cited as having "an orgy of stalactite stucco-work" which "drips from the ceiling and combines with a mind-boggling excess of zellij work." The museum's large atrium (originally a courtyard, now covered in glass and fabric) contains a very large centrally hung chandelier consisting of metal plates decorated with fine geometric and epigraphic cuttings. Several features of the original courtyard, including the floor-set basins and mosaics have been retained. The museum holds exhibits of both modern and traditional Moroccan art together with fine examples of historical books, coins and pottery of Moroccan Jewish, Berber and Arab cultures.

=== Dar Si Said Museum ===
Dar Si Said Museum, also known as the Museum of Moroccan Arts, is located to the north of the Bahia Palace, right from the Rue Riad Zitoun el-Jedid. It was originally the mansion of Si Said, the brother of Ba Ahmed. After 1930 it was converted into a museum of Moroccan art and woodcraft. The collection of the museum included "jewellery from the High Atlas, the Anti Atlas and the extreme south; carpets from the Haouz and the High Atlas; oil lamps from Taroudannt; blue pottery from Safi and green pottery from Tamgroute; and leatherwork from Marrakesh." Until recent renovations, one of its oldest and most significant artifacts was an early 11th-century marble basin from the late caliphal period of Cordoba, Spain. Following renovations carried out by the Fondation Nationale des Musées, it was reopened in 2018 as the National Museum of Weaving and Carpets.

=== Berber Museum of the Jardin Majorelle ===
The former home and villa of Jacques Majorelle, a blue-coloured building within the Majorelle Gardens, was converted into the Berber Museum (Musée Pierre Bergé des Arts Berbères) in 2011, after previously serving as a museum of Islamic art. It exhibits a variety of objects of Amazigh (Berber) culture from across different regions of Morocco.

This museum displays a collection of Berber objects originating from diverse regions of Morocco, from the Rif to the Sahara. The former museum of Islamic art, located in the heart of the Majorelle Garden, has been entirely renovated to house the Berber Museum and to preserve this collection of Berber art in conditions of presentation and conservation in accordance with international museum standards. The team which guided the conception of the museum is composed of: Salima Naji, architect and anthropologist in Rabat; Romain Simenel, ethnologist, researcher at the Institute for Research and Development in Rabat; Ahmed Skounti, anthropologist at the National Institute of Archeological Sciences and Heritage in Rabat. The renovation of the Museum, as well as its scenography, was carried out by the architect Christophe Martin, who also conceived the presentation of the exhibition Yves Saint Laurent and Morocco, seen by over 65,000 visitors. At his side, the museologist Björn Dahlström was responsible for coordinating the program of the museum until December 2019.

With a floor space of over 200 m^{2}, the Museum displays more than 600 objects which display aspects of Berber culture in Morocco. Maps, explanatory texts (in French, English and Arabic), photographs, archive films and audio-visual documents specifically designed for the museum guide the visitors throughout their journey. There are four thematic rooms: 1. The Berbers, 2. Traditional skills (craftwork, daily objects, festivals or ceremonies), 3. Jewels (an exclusive panorama of Berber jewels from Morocco), 4. Finery (costumes and weaving, arms, doors, carpets and Berber musical instruments).

=== Other museums ===
The House of Photography of Marrakech, opened by Patrick Menac’h and Hamid Mergani in 2009, holds exhibits of vintage Moroccan photography from the 1870s to 1950s. It is housed in a renovated traditional house in the medina. The Mouassine Museum, by the same owners, consists of a historic 16th–17th-century house in the Mouassine neighbourhood, formerly inhabited by the family of painter Abdelhay Mellakh, which was opened as a museum and cultural venue in 2014 and since 2020 has also served a museum of Moroccan music (Musée de la Musique), in addition to hosting musical performances.

Elsewhere in the medina, the Dar El Bacha hosts the Musée des Confluences, which opened in 2017. The museum holds temporary exhibits highlighting different facets of Moroccan culture as well as various art objects from different cultures across the world. The Tiskiwin Museum is housed in another restored medina mansion and features a collection of artifacts from across the former the trans-Saharan trade routes that were connected to the city. Various other small and often privately owned museums also exist in the medina, such as the Musée Boucharouite and the Perfume Museum (Musée du Parfum). Dar Bellarj, an arts center located in a former mansion next to the Ben Youssef Mosque, also occasionally hosts art exhibits.

A number of art galleries and museums are also found outside the medina, in Gueliz and its surrounding districts in the new city. The Museum of Art and Culture of Marrakesh (MACMA), opened in 2016, houses a collection of Moroccan art objects and photography from the 1870s to 1970s. Since 2019, its collection of Orientalist paintings are now housed at its sister museum, the Orientalist Museum in the medina. The Museum of African Contemporary Art Al Maaden (MACAAL) is a non-profit art gallery that exhibits contemporary Moroccan and African art. The Yves Saint Laurent Museum, opened in 2017 in a new building near the Jardin Majorelle, displays a collection of work spanning the career of French fashion designer Yves Saint Laurent. It is a sister museum to the Yves Saint Laurent Museum in Paris.

== Education and culture institutions ==
=== Ben Youssef Madrasa ===
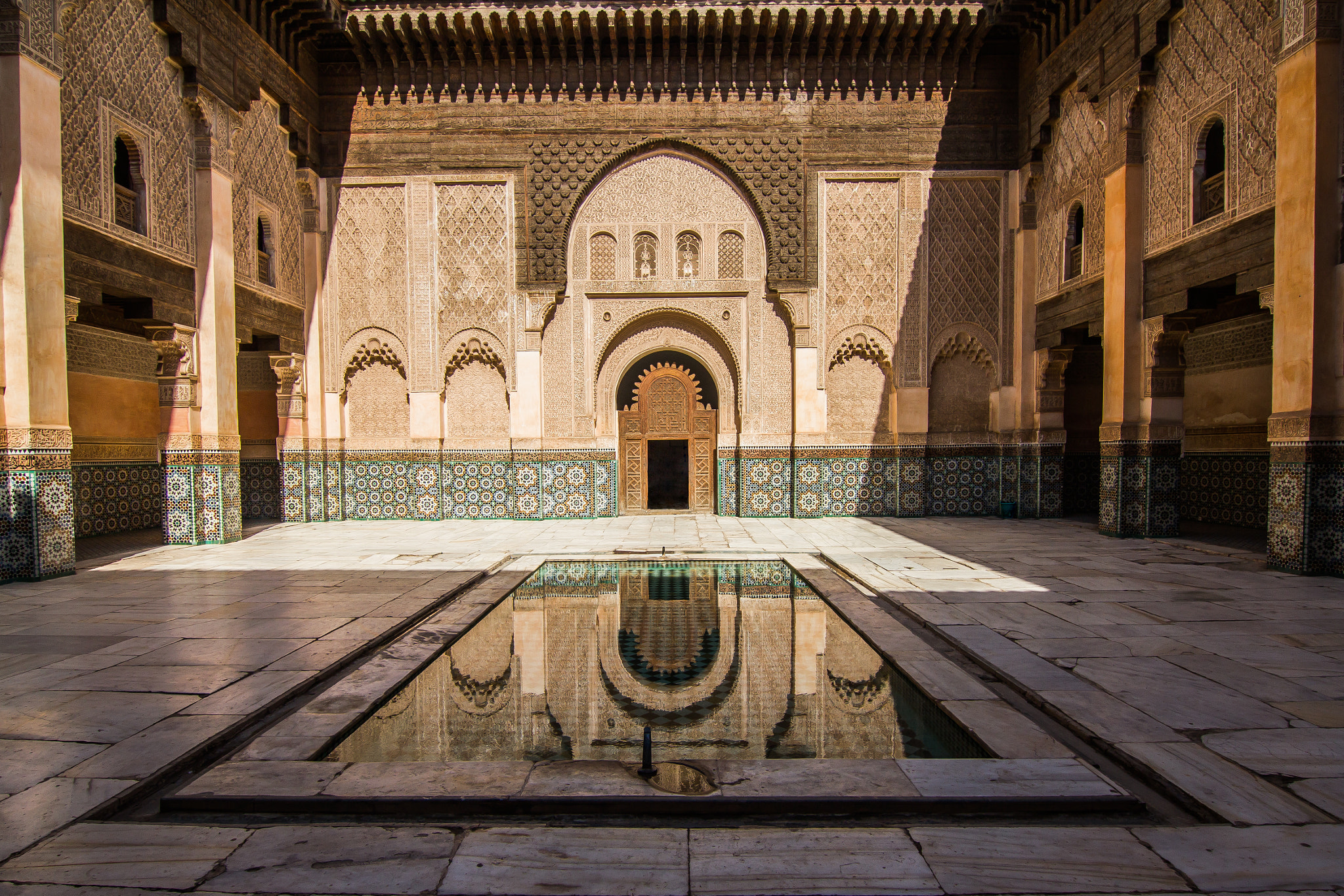
Courtyard of the Ben Youssef Madrasa in Marrakesh, Morocco (16th century)

The Ben Youssef Madrasa, located to the north of the Medina, was an Islamic college in Marrakech, named after the Almoravid sultan Ali ibn Yusuf (reigned 1106–1142), who expanded the city and its influence considerably. It is the largest Medrasa in all of Morocco and was one of the largest theological colleges in North Africa and may have housed as many as 900 students. Functioning today as a historical site, the Ben Youssef Madrasa was the largest Islamic college in the Maghreb at its height, and is widely recognized as a pinnacle of Saadian and Moroccan architecture.

The college was founded during the period of the Marinid (14th century) by the Marinid sultan Abu al-Hassan and allied to the neighbouring Ben Youssef Mosque. This education complex in Koranic teachings was part of similar institutions in Fez, Taza, Tale, and Meknes. The Madrasa was re-constructed by the Saadian Sultan Abdallah al-Ghalib (1557–1574) in 1564 as the largest and unrivaled madrasa in Morocco. In 1565 the works ordered by Abdallah al-Ghalib were finished, as attested by the inscription in the prayer room. Its 130 student dormitory cells cluster around a courtyard richly carved in cedar, marble and stucco. In accordance with Islam, the carvings contain no representation of humans or animals, consisting entirely of inscriptions and geometric patterns. One of the school's best known teachers was Mohammed al-Ifrani (1670-1745). Closed down in 1960, the building was refurbished and reopened to the public as a historical site in 1982.

=== Cadi Ayyad University ===
Cadi Ayyad University (also known as the University of Marrakech), and its component, the École nationale des sciences appliquées de Marrakech (ENSA Marrakech), which was created in 2000 by the Ministry of Higher Education and specializes in engineering and scientific research. Cadi Ayyad University was established in 1978 and operates 13 institutions in the Marrakech Tensift Elhaouz and Abda Doukkala regions of Morocco in 4 main cities, including Kalaa of Sraghna, Essaouira and Safi aside from Marrakech.

=== Theatres ===
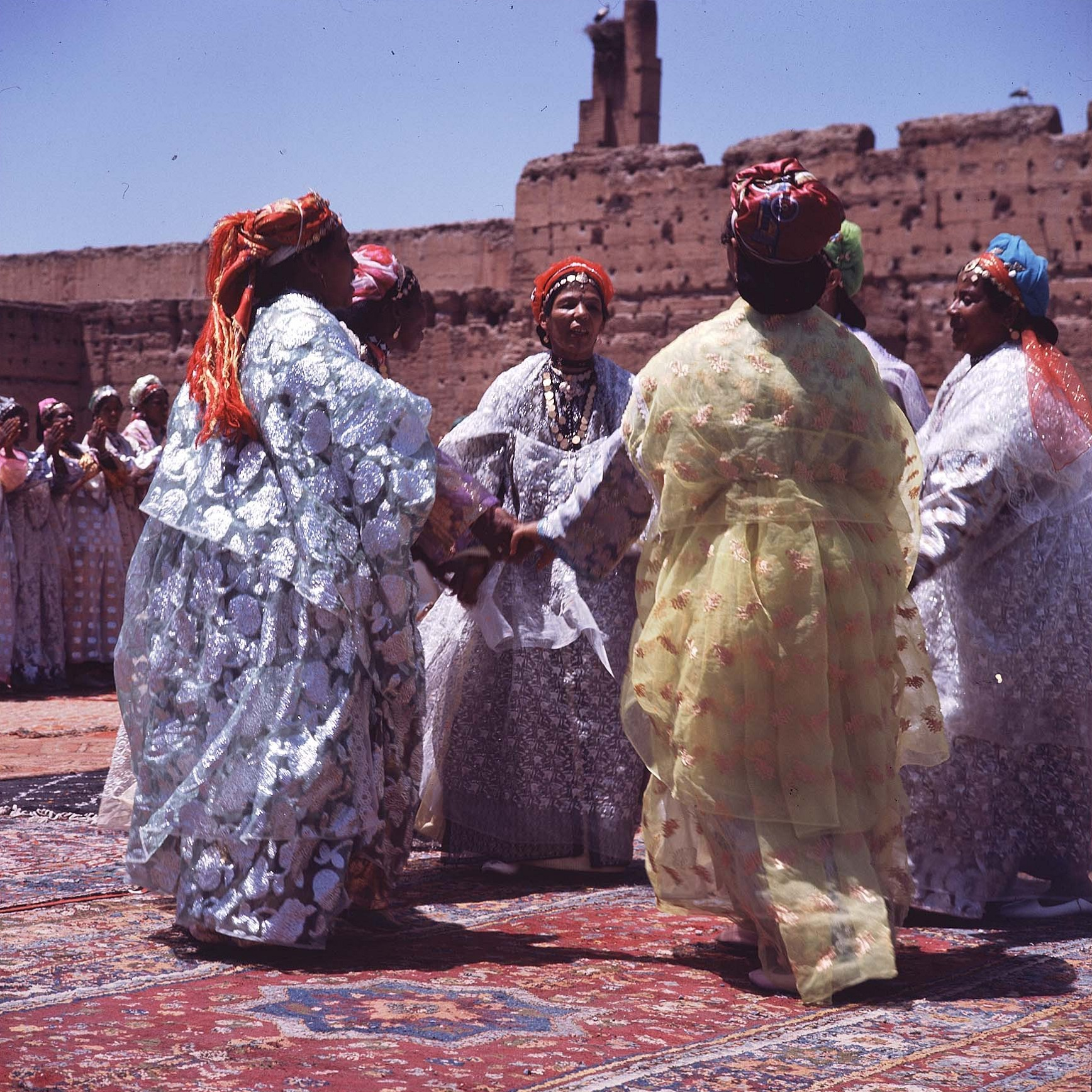
Berber dancers

Théâtre Royal de Marrakesh, Institut Français and Dar Chérifa are major performing arts institutions in the city. The Théâtre Royal, built by Tunisian architect Charles Boccara with columns, puts on theatrical performances of comedy, opera, and dance in French and Arabic. A greater number perform outdoors and entertain tourists on the main square and the streets, especially at night.

== Transportation ==
=== Marrakesh-Menara Airport ===
The Marrakesh-Menara Airport (RAK) is 3 kilometres (1.9 mi) southwest from the city centre. It is an international facility that receives several European flights as well as flights from Casablanca and some of the Arab world nations. The airport is located at an elevation of 471 metres (1,545 ft) at 31°36′25″N 008°02′11″W. The airport has two formal passenger terminals, but these are more or less combined to one large terminal. A third terminal is being built. The existing T1/T2 terminals offer a space of 42,000 metres (138,000 ft) and has a designed capacity to handle 4.5 million passengers a year. The runway is 4.5 kilometres (2.8 mi) long and has a width of 45 metres (148 ft). The airport ramp can accommodate 14 Boeing 737-sized aircraft and four Boeing 747-sized aircraft. The separate freight-terminal has 340 square metres (3,700 sq ft) of covered space.

=== Marrakesh Railway Station ===
The Marrakesh Railway Station (or Gare de Marrakech) was first built in 1923 during the French Protectorate, but the current building was opened in 2008 to replace the old one. Its design was inspired by the monumental gateways typical of historic Moroccan architecture.

=== Oued Tensift historic bridge ===
The Oued Tensift Bridge is a stone bridge built by the Almohads in the 12th century to replace an earlier Almoravid bridge which was destroyed. It was designed to allow crossings of the river during its yearly floods. The bridge originally consisted of 15 arches but has been expanded to 27 arches as the riverbed widened over the years. Its pillars have a pointed and stepped profile on their upstream side in order to resist the force of the waters.

== See also ==
- Tourism in Morocco
