= Oued Tensift Bridge =

Historic bridge over Tensift River, Morocco

Coordinates: 31°41′31.5″N 7°59′17.7″W

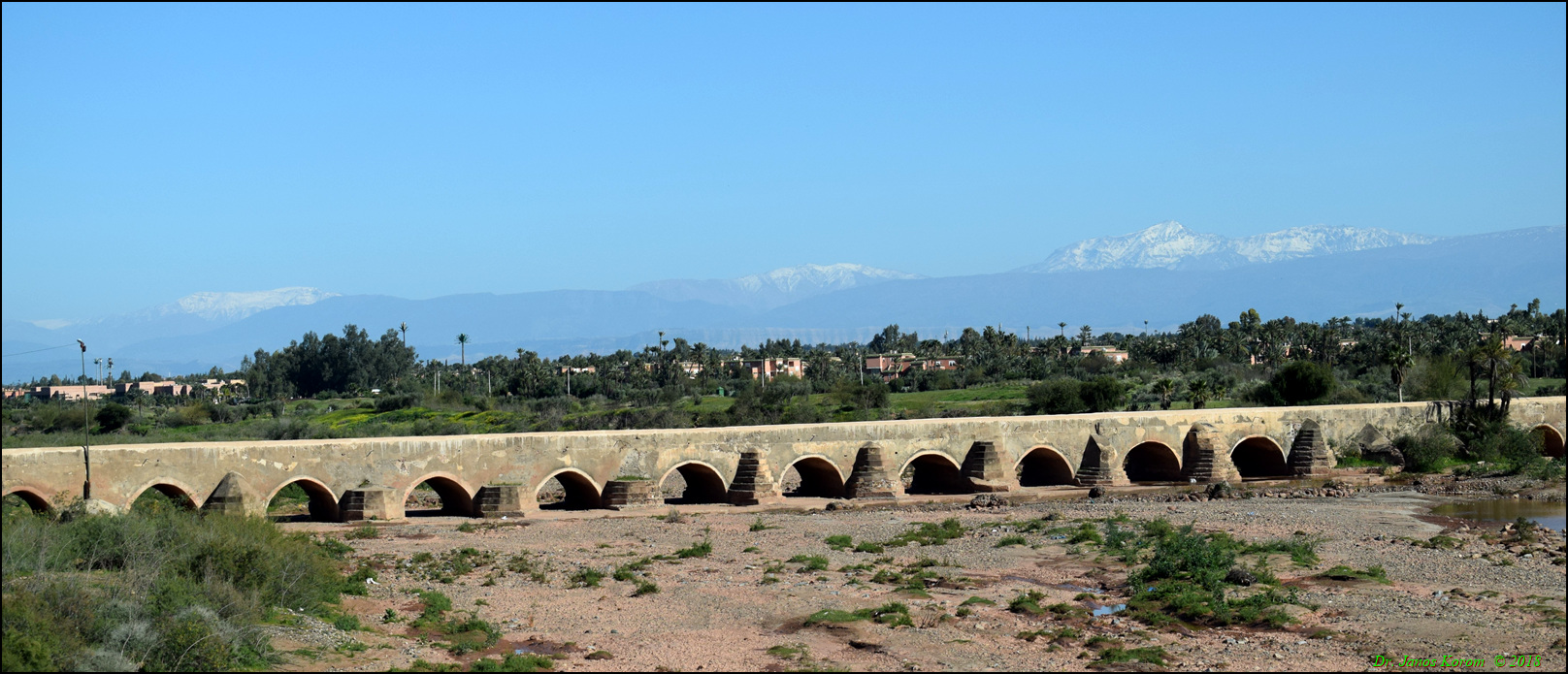
The bridge today

The Oued Tensift Bridge is a historic bridge over the Tensift River located just north of Marrakesh in Morocco. It was originally built during the Almohad period in the 12th century.

== History ==
According to the historical writings of Al-Idrisi, a first bridge over the Tensift River was built by the Almoravid emir Ali Ibn Yusuf (ruled 1106–1143) with the help of architects from al-Andalus. The bridge was strategically important as it allowed the river to be crossed during its yearly floods. However, this first bridge was destroyed by floods a few years after completion.

Around 1170 CE, the Almohad ruler Abu Ya'qub Yusuf ordered the reconstruction of the bridge at a less vulnerable point 400 meters downstream. According to Marmol, this original bridge had 15 arches. Today the bridge has 27 arches, most likely due to the fact that the riverbed has widened since the 12th century and the bridge therefore had to be extended in turn over the years. The original Almohad bridge most likely corresponds to the middle sections of the current bridge. The bridge is built on pillars that have a stepped and pointed profile upstream and a simply blunt profile downstream, allowing the structure to withstand the force of the waters over centuries.

== See also ==
- List of bridges in Morocco
- Landmarks of Marrakesh
