= President Donald J. Trump Highway =

The President Donald J. Trump Highway may refer to:

- President Donald J. Trump Highway, a 20-mile portion of U.S. Route 287 in Oklahoma (named in May 2021).
- President Donald J. Trump Highway, a proposed name for the planned Interstate 73 in South Carolina (adopted in March 2026).
- President Donald J. Trump Highway, the official name for Florida State Road 80 (named in July 2026).
- President Donald J. Trump Highway, the Tiznit–Dakhla segment of National Route 1 in Morocco and Western Sahara (named in July 2026).
