= Tensift =

River in Morocco

Coordinates: 32°01′56″N 9°20′40″W

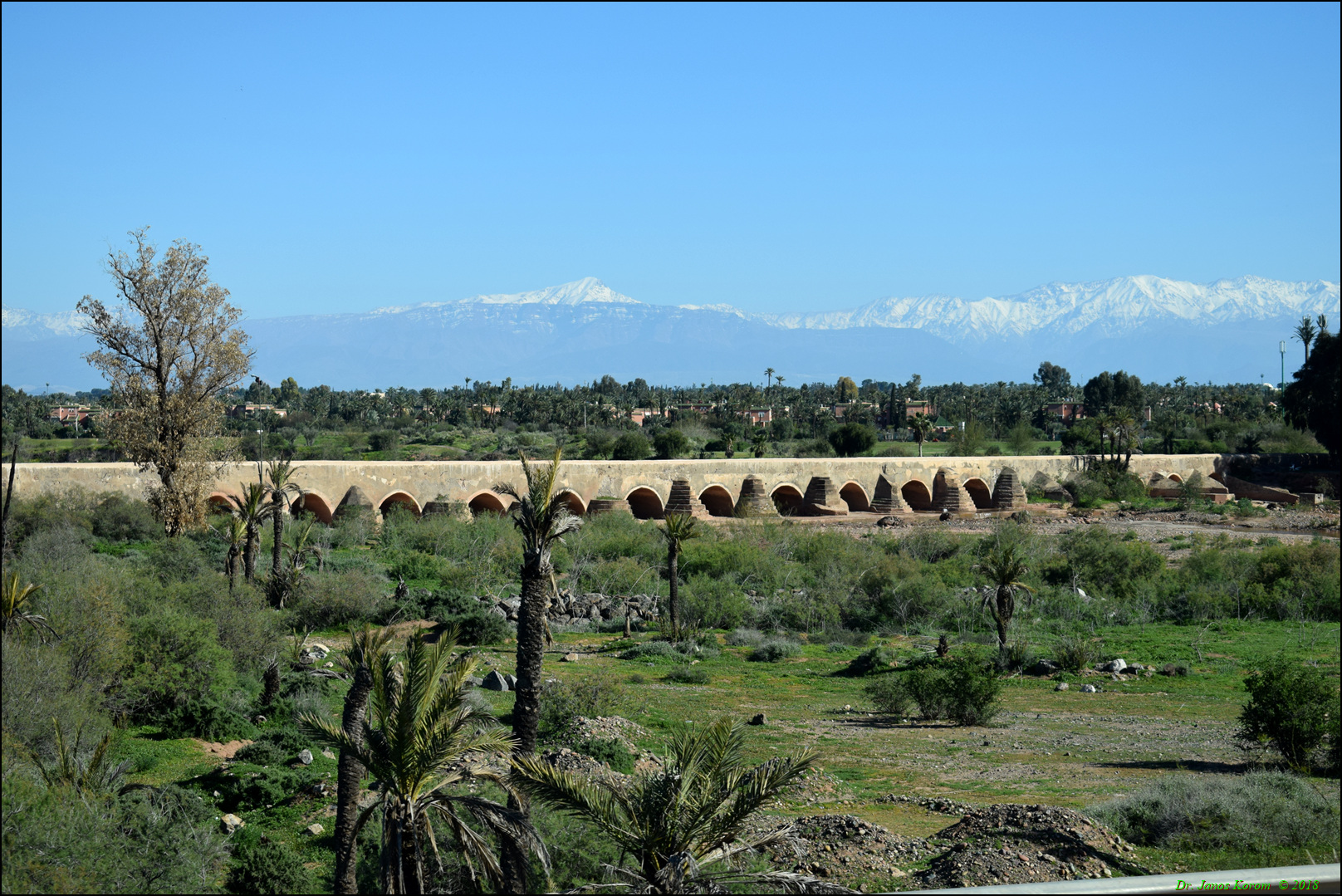
- the Almohad bridge over the Tensift

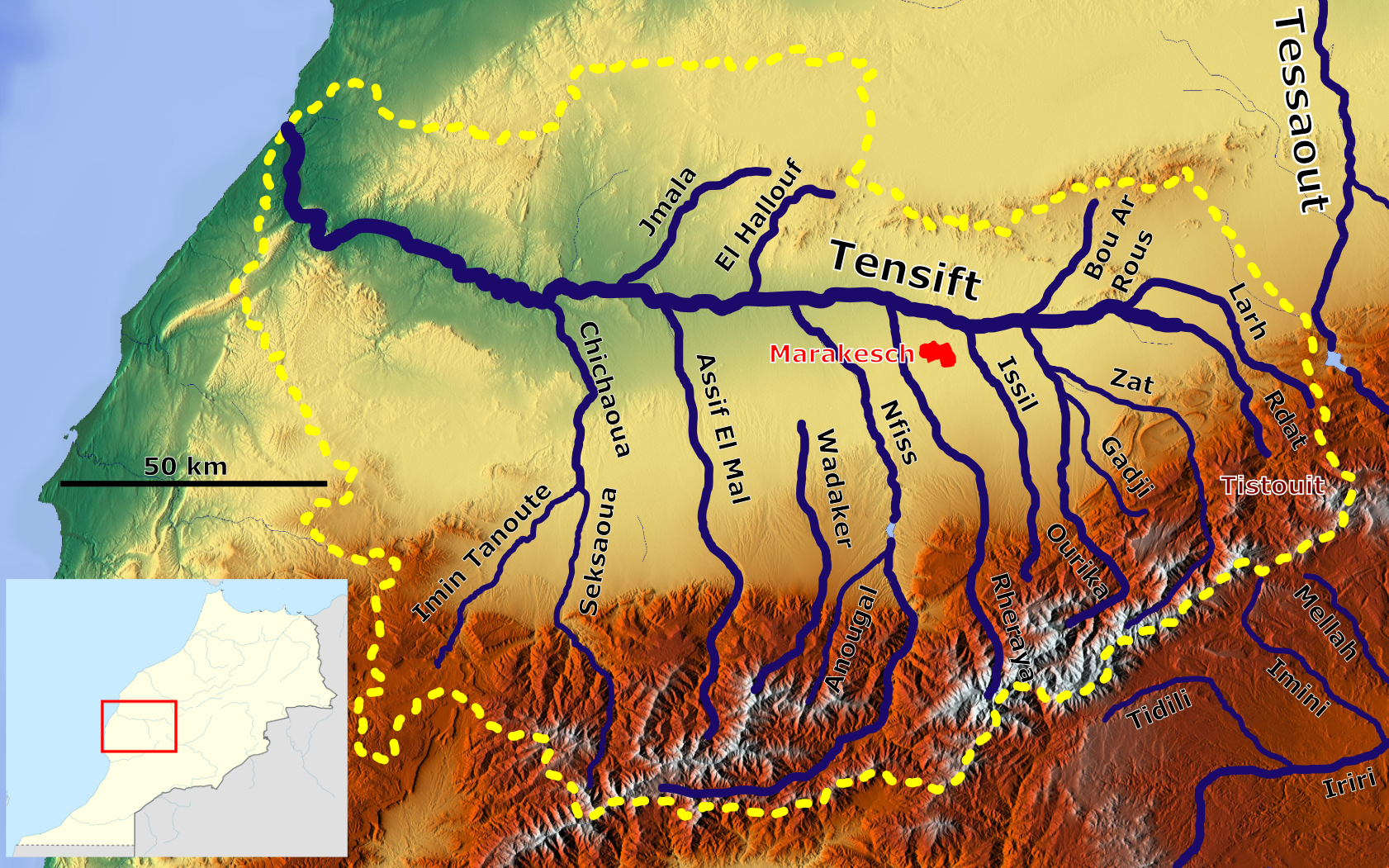
- The catchment area of the Tensift

Location
- Country: Morocco

Physical characteristics
- Source
  - location: High Atlas
- Mouth
  - location: Atlantic Ocean
- Length: 250 km (160 mi)

The Tensift (Tachelhit: ⵜⴰⵏⵙⵉⴼⵜ, romanized: tansift; Arabic: تانسيفت) is a river in central Morocco. It originates in the eastern High Atlas, receiving water from many tributaries in the region. It passes close to the city of Marrakesh and has its outlet into the Atlantic Ocean at the ancient fortress of Souira Qedima (Aguz), around 40 km south from Safi. Its water discharge changes according to rainfall; it is one of the ten major rivers of Morocco, but frequently can be waded through even close to its outlet.

== See also ==
- Oued Tensift Bridge
