= Almoravid architecture =

Period of architecture in North Africa and Spain

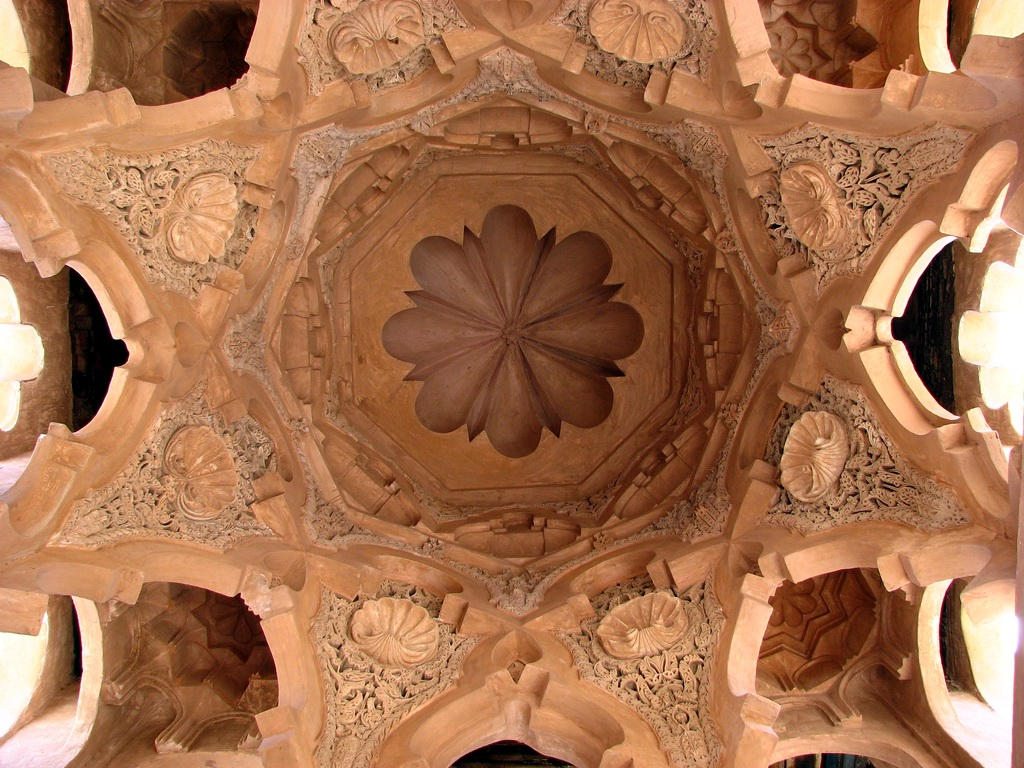
Interior of the Almoravid Qubba in Marrakesh

Almoravid architecture corresponds to a period from the 11th to 12th centuries when the Almoravids ruled over the western Maghreb (present-day Morocco and western Algeria) and al-Andalus (a large part of present-day Spain and Portugal). It was an important phase in the development of a regional Moorish (or western Islamic) architecture, as the styles and craftsmanship of al-Andalus were further imported and developed in North Africa. The Almoravids founded the city of Marrakesh as their capital and built many mosques in the region, although much of what they built has not preserved. The Almoravids were overthrown by the Almohads in the 12th century, after which Almohad architecture continued to develop some of the same trends in the Maghreb and al-Andalus.

== General ==
The Almoravid period, along with the subsequent Almohad period, is considered one of the most formative stages of Moorish and Moroccan architecture, establishing many of the forms and motifs of this style that were refined in subsequent centuries. Manuel Casamar Perez remarks that the Almoravids scaled back the Andalusi trend towards heavier and more elaborate decoration which had developed since the Caliphate of Córdoba and instead prioritized a greater balance between proportions and ornamentation.

The two centers of artistic production in the Islamic west before the rise of the Almoravids were Kairouan and Córdoba, both former capitals in the region which served as sources of inspiration. The Almoravids were responsible for establishing a new imperial capital at Marrakesh, which became a major center of architectural patronage thereafter. After taking control of Al-Andalus in the Battle of Sagrajas, the Almoravids sent Muslim, Christian and Jewish artisans from Iberia to North Africa to work on monuments.

The Almoravids made use of Andalusi craftsmen throughout their realms, thus helping to spread the highly ornate architectural style of al-Andalus to North Africa. Almoravid architecture assimilated the motifs and innovations of Andalusi architecture, such as the complex interlacing arches of the Great Mosque in Cordoba and of the Aljaferia palace in Zaragoza, but it also introduced new ornamental techniques from the east, such as muqarnas ("stalactite" or "honeycomb" carvings), and added its own innovations, such as the lambrequin arch and the use of pillars instead of columns in mosques. Stucco-carved decoration began to appear more and more as part of these compositions and would become even more elaborate in subsequent periods. Almoravid patronage thus marks a period of transition for architecture in the region, setting the stage for future developments.

== Mosques ==
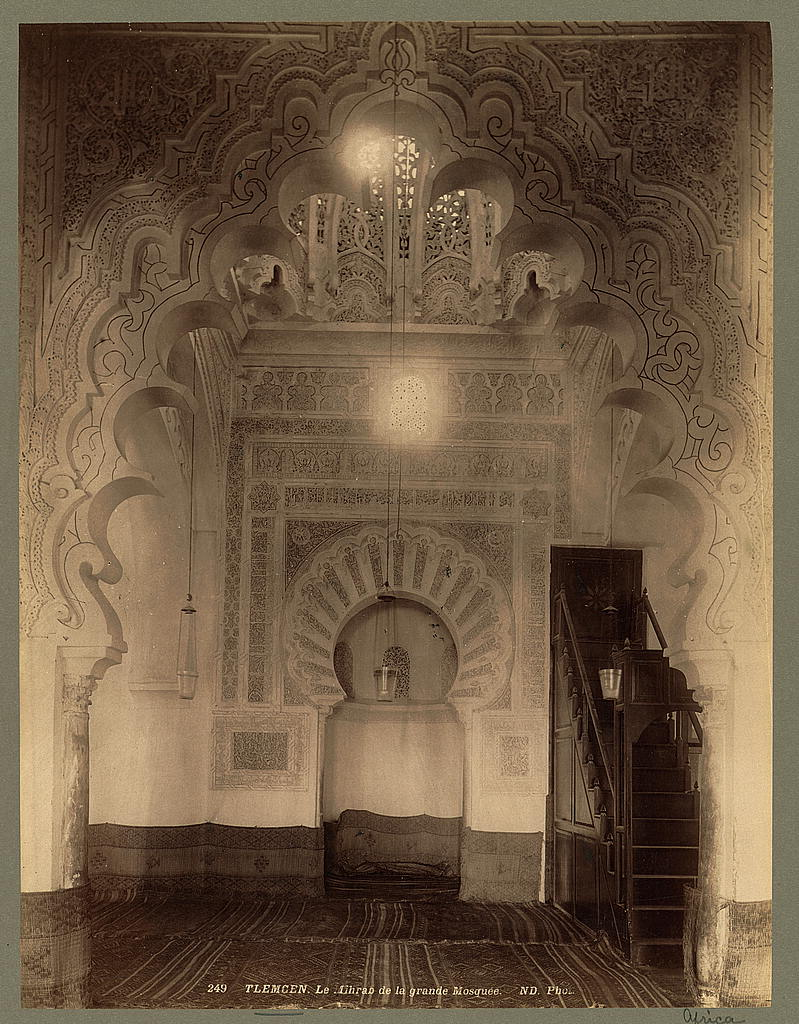
Mihrab area of the Great Mosque of Tlemcen, remodeled in 1136 under Ali ibn Yusuf. The mihrab is preceded by a large multifoil arch and is decorated with carved stucco. Above it, the decorative plaster cupola is partly visible. (Photo circa 1860)

The Great Mosque in Algiers (c. 1097), the Great Mosque of Tlemcen (1136) and al-Qarawiyyin (expanded in 1135) in Fez are important examples of Almoravid architecture. The Almoravid Qubba is one of the few Almoravid monuments in Marrakesh surviving, and is notable for its highly ornate interior dome with carved stucco decoration, complex arch shapes, and minor muqarnas cupolas in the corners of the structure.

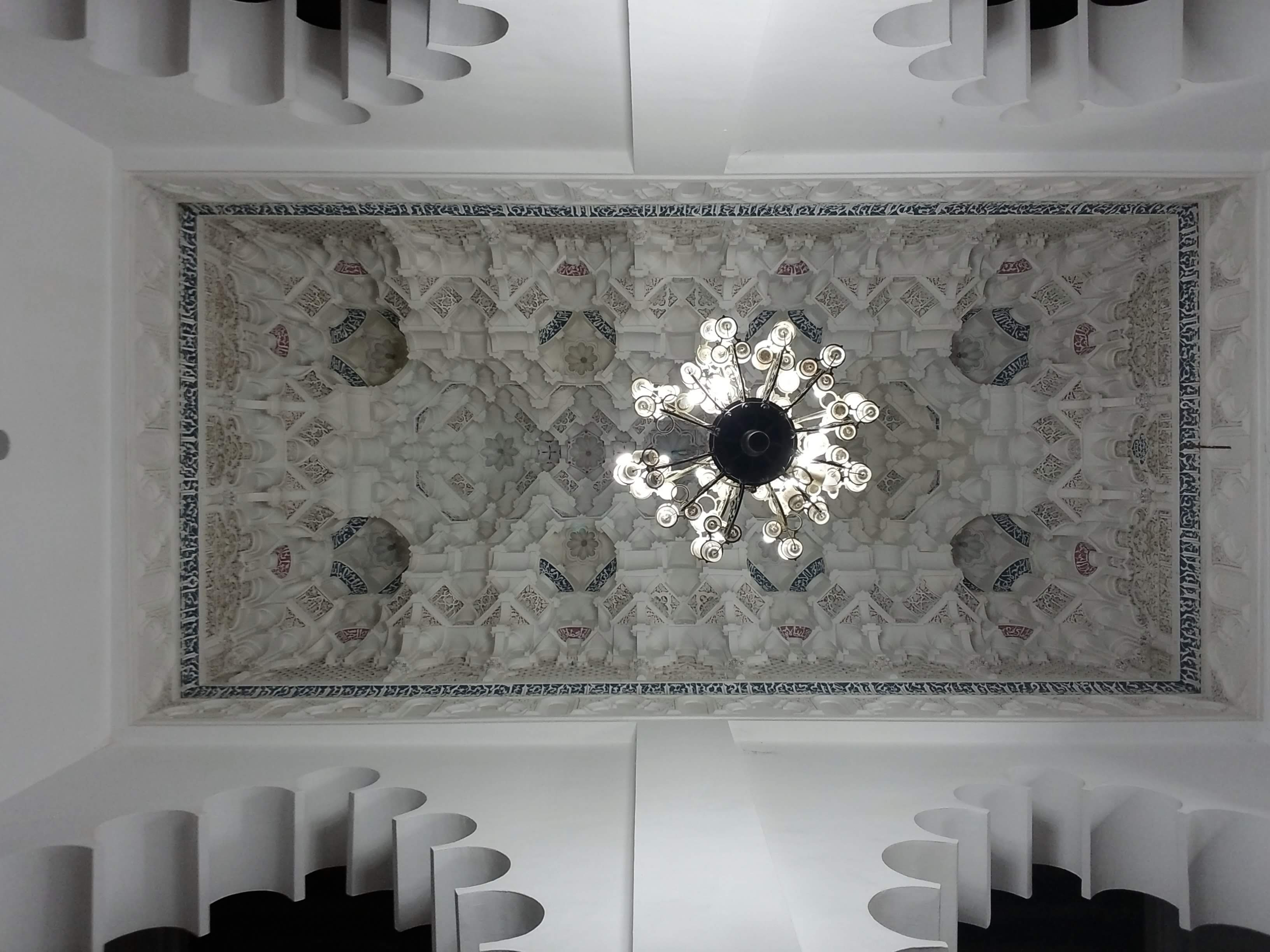
Muqarnas vault in the Qarawiyyin Mosque

The central nave of the expanded Qarawiyyin Mosque notably features the earliest full-fledged example of muqarnas vaulting in the western Islamic world. The complexity of these muqarnas vaults at such an early date – only several decades after the first simple muqarnas vaults appeared in distant Iraq – has been noted by architectural historians as surprising.

Another high point of Almoravid architecture is the intricate ribbed dome in front of the mihrab of the Great Mosque of Tlemcen, which likely traces its origins to the 10th-century ribbed domes of the Great Mosque of Córdoba. The structure of the dome is strictly ornamental, consisting of multiple ribs or intersecting arches forming a twelve-pointed star pattern. It is also partly see-through, allowing some outside light to filter through a screen of pierced and carved arabesque decoration that fills the spaces between the ribs.

== Fortifications ==
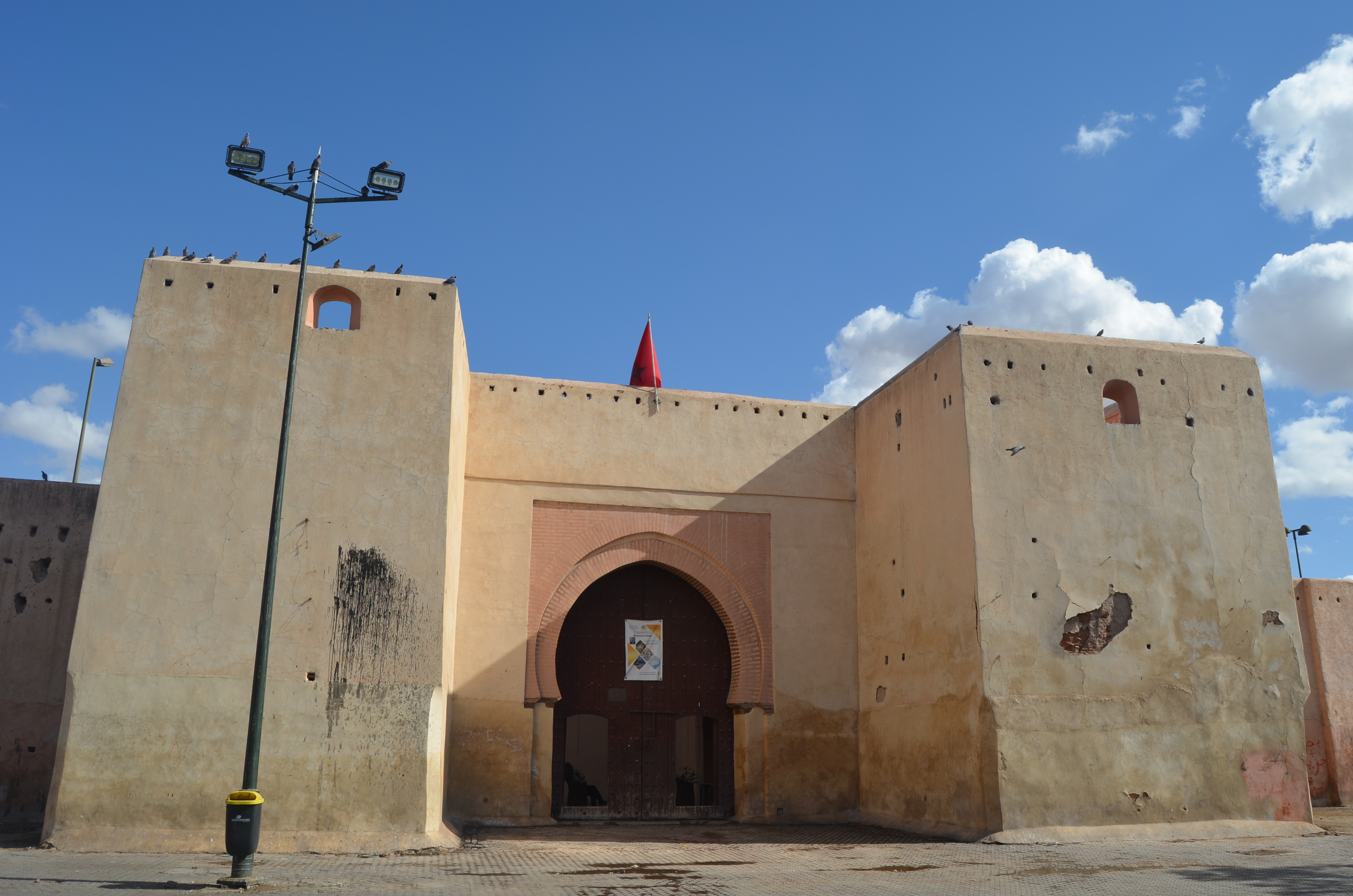
Bab Doukkala, one of the original gates of Marrakesh (circa 1126)

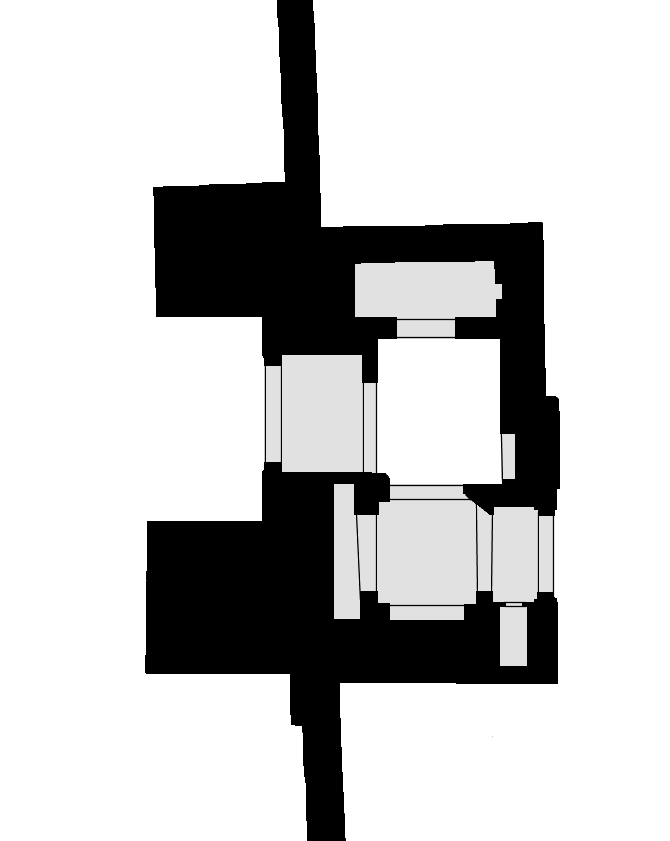
Floor plan of Bab Doukkala, showing its bent entrance design

The Almoravids also built many fortifications, although most of these in turn were demolished or modified by the Almohads and later dynasties. The new capital, Marrakesh, initially had no city walls but a fortress known as the Ksar el-Hajjar ("Fortress of Stone") was built by the city's founder, Abu Bakr ibn Umar, in order to house the treasury and serve as an initial residence.

Eventually, circa 1126, Ali Ibn Yusuf also constructed a full set of walls, made of rammed earth, around the city in response to the growing threat of the Almohads. These walls, although much restored and partly expanded in later centuries, continue to serve as the walls of the medina of Marrakesh today. The medina's main gates were also first built at this time, although many of them have since been significantly modified. Bab Doukkala, one of the western gates, is believed to have best preserved its original Almoravid layout. It has a bent entrance configuration, of which variations are found throughout the medieval period of the Maghreb and Al-Andalus, as well as in the Middle East. The gate's passage turns 90 degrees to the right and then 90 degrees to the left, with the two exits/entrances parallel to each other, flanked by two large square bastions. This specific plan is unique in Marrakesh but is characteristically Almoravid, perhaps representing an evolved version of previous gate plans.

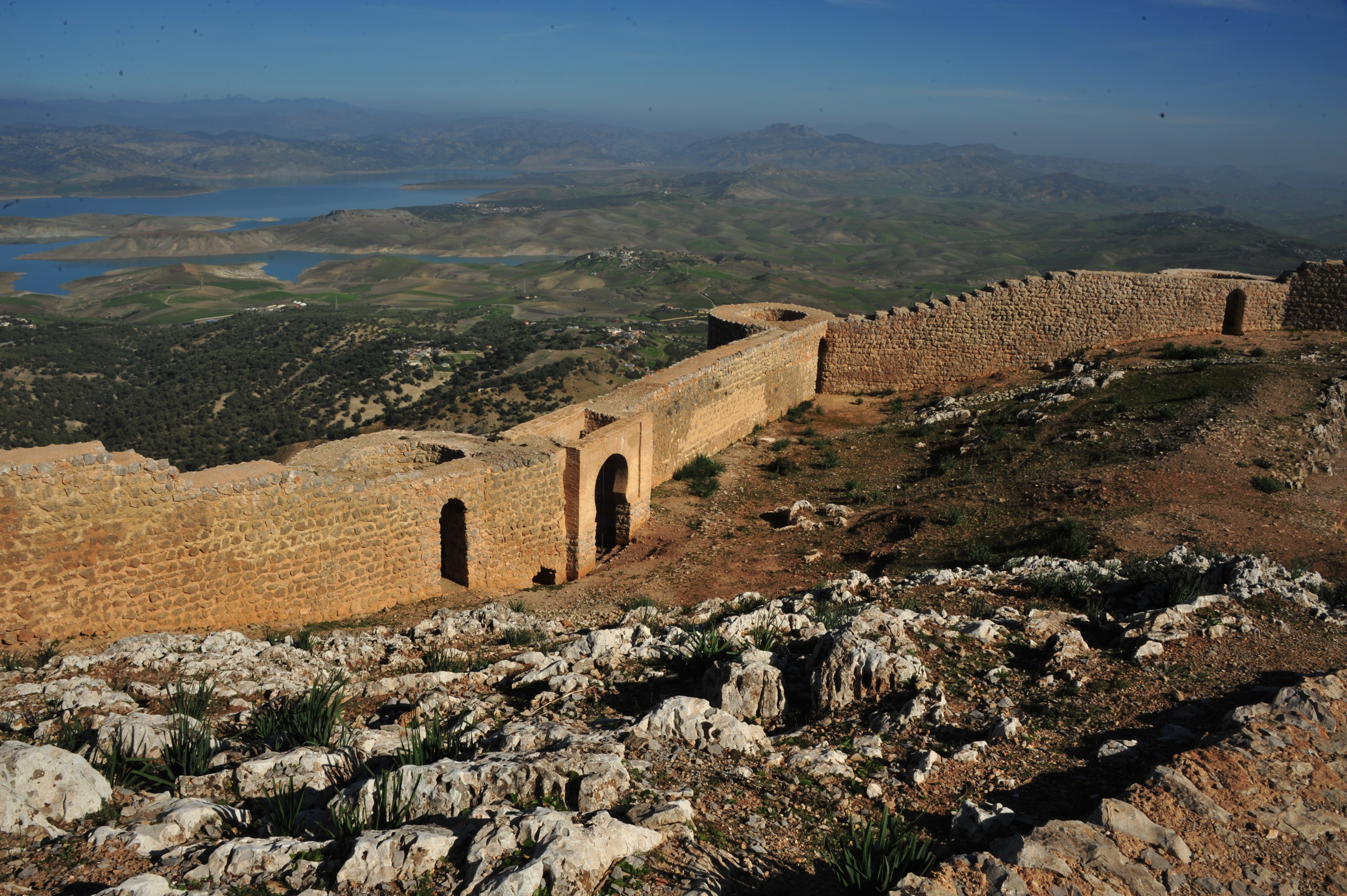
The Kasbah of Amargu, an Almoravid fortress north of Fez

Elsewhere, the archaeological site of Tasghîmût, southeast of Marrakesh, and Kasbah of Amargu, northeast of Fes, provide evidence about other Almoravid forts. Built out of rubble stone or rammed earth, they illustrate similarities with older Hammadid fortifications, as well as an apparent need to build quickly during times of crisis. The walls of Tlemcen (present-day Algeria) were likewise partly built by the Almoravids, using a mix of rubble stone at the base and rammed earth above.

== Palaces and houses ==
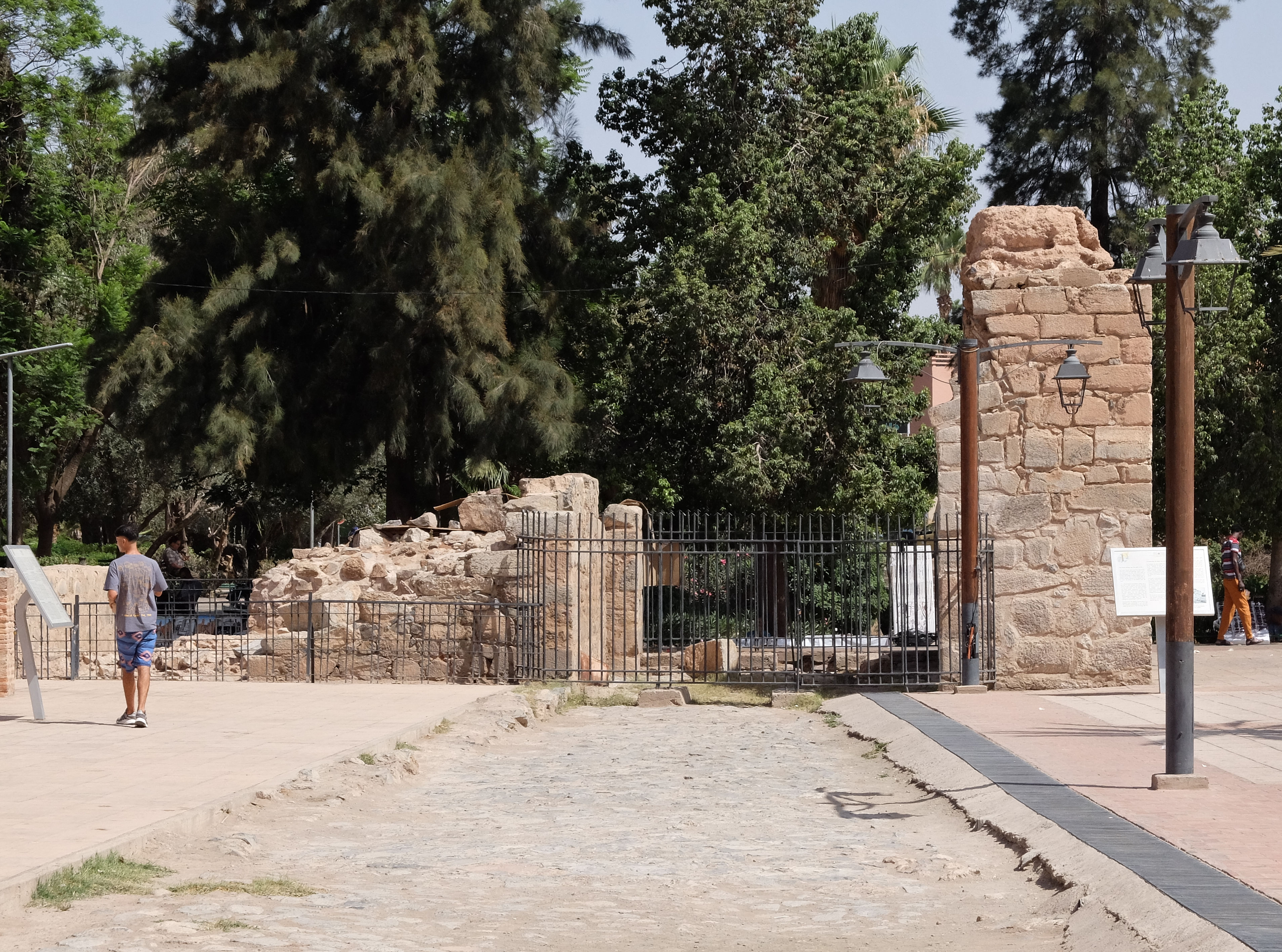
The possible remains of a stone tower or gate, identified by some as part of the Almoravid palace-fortress, the Ksar al-Hajjar

In domestic architecture, none of the Almoravid palaces or residences have survived, and they are known only through texts and archaeology. During his reign, Ali Ibn Yusuf added a large palace and royal residence on the south side of the Ksar el-Hajjar (on the present site of the Kutubiyya Mosque). This palace was later abandoned and its function was replaced by the Almohad Kasbah, but some of its remains have been excavated and studied in the 20th century. These remains have revealed the earliest known example in Morocco of a riad garden (an interior garden symmetrically divided into four parts).

In 1960 other excavations near Chichaoua revealed the remains of a domestic complex or settlement dating from the Almoravid period or even earlier. It consisted of several houses, two hammams, a water supply system, and possibly a mosque. On the site were found many fragments of architectural decoration which are now preserved at the Archeological Museum of Rabat. These fragments are made of deeply-carved stucco featuring Kufic and cursive Arabic inscriptions as well as vegetal motifs such as palmettes and acanthus leaves. The structures also featured painted decoration in red ochre, typically consisting of border motifs composed of two interlacing bands. Similar decoration has also been found in the remains of former houses excavated in 2006 under the 12th-century Almoravid expansion of the Qarawiyyin Mosque in Fes. In addition to the usual border motifs were larger interlacing geometric motifs as well as Kufic inscriptions with vegetal backgrounds, all executed predominantly in red.

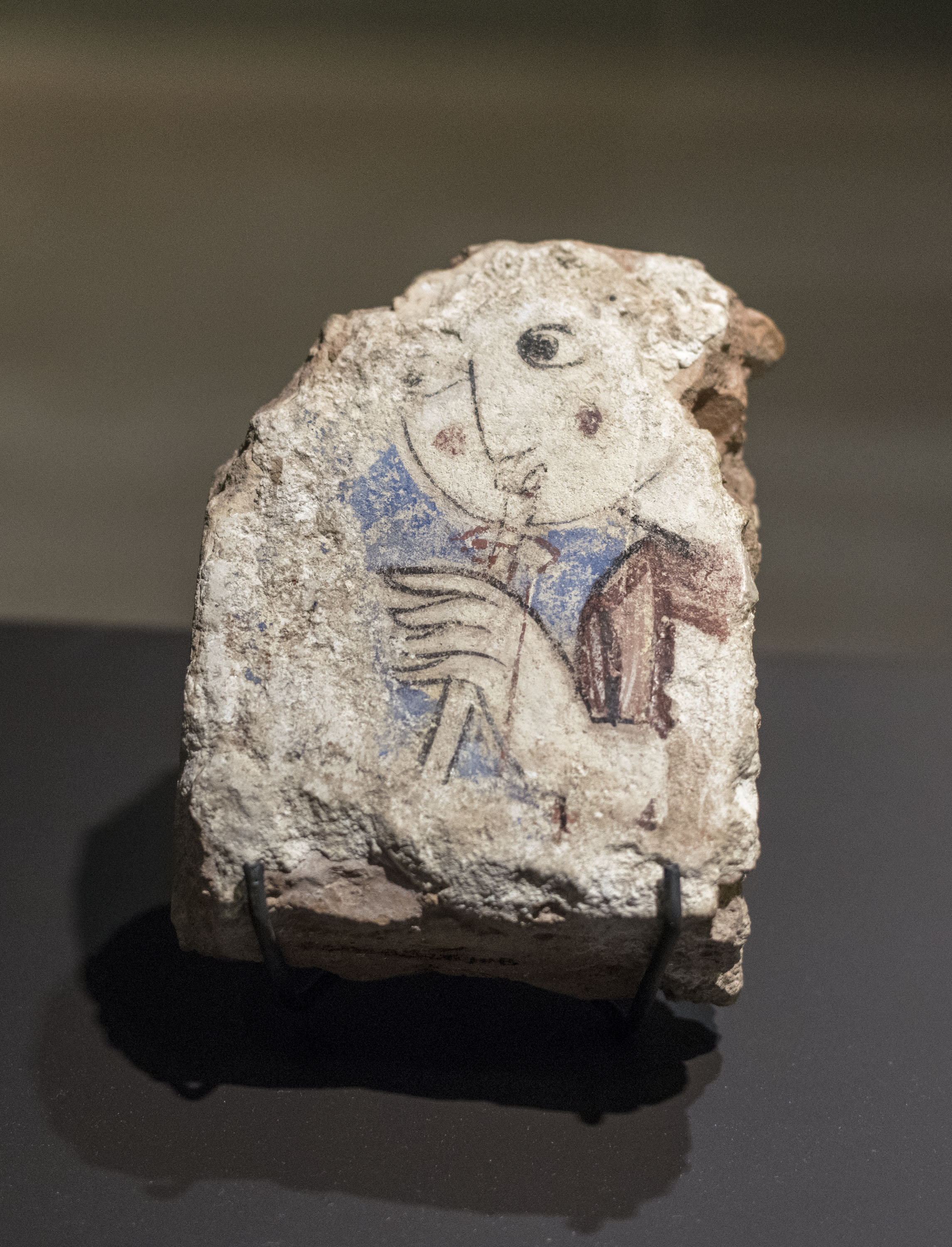
Fragment of painted decoration depicting a flutist, from the al-Qasr al-Seghir in Murcia (12th century)

In present-day Spain, the oldest surviving muqarnas fragments were found in a palace built by Muhammad Ibn Mardanish, the independent ruler of Murcia (1147–1172). The remains of the palace, known as al-Qasr al-Seghir (or Alcázar Seguir in Spanish) are part of the present-day Monastery of Santa Clara in Murcia. The muqarnas fragments are painted with images of musicians and other figures. Ibn Mardanish also constructed what is now known as the Castillejo de Monteagudo, a hilltop castle and fortified palace outside the city that is one of the best-preserved examples of Almoravid-era architecture in the Iberian Peninsula. It has a rectangular plan and contained a large riad garden courtyard with symmetrical reception halls facing each other across the long axis of the garden.

== See also ==
- Minbar of the Kutubiyya Mosque
