= Almoravid Qubba =

Historic monument in Marrakesh, Morocco

- القبة المرابطية (Arabic)
- Qubbat al-Ba'diyyin, Qubbat al-Barudiyyin
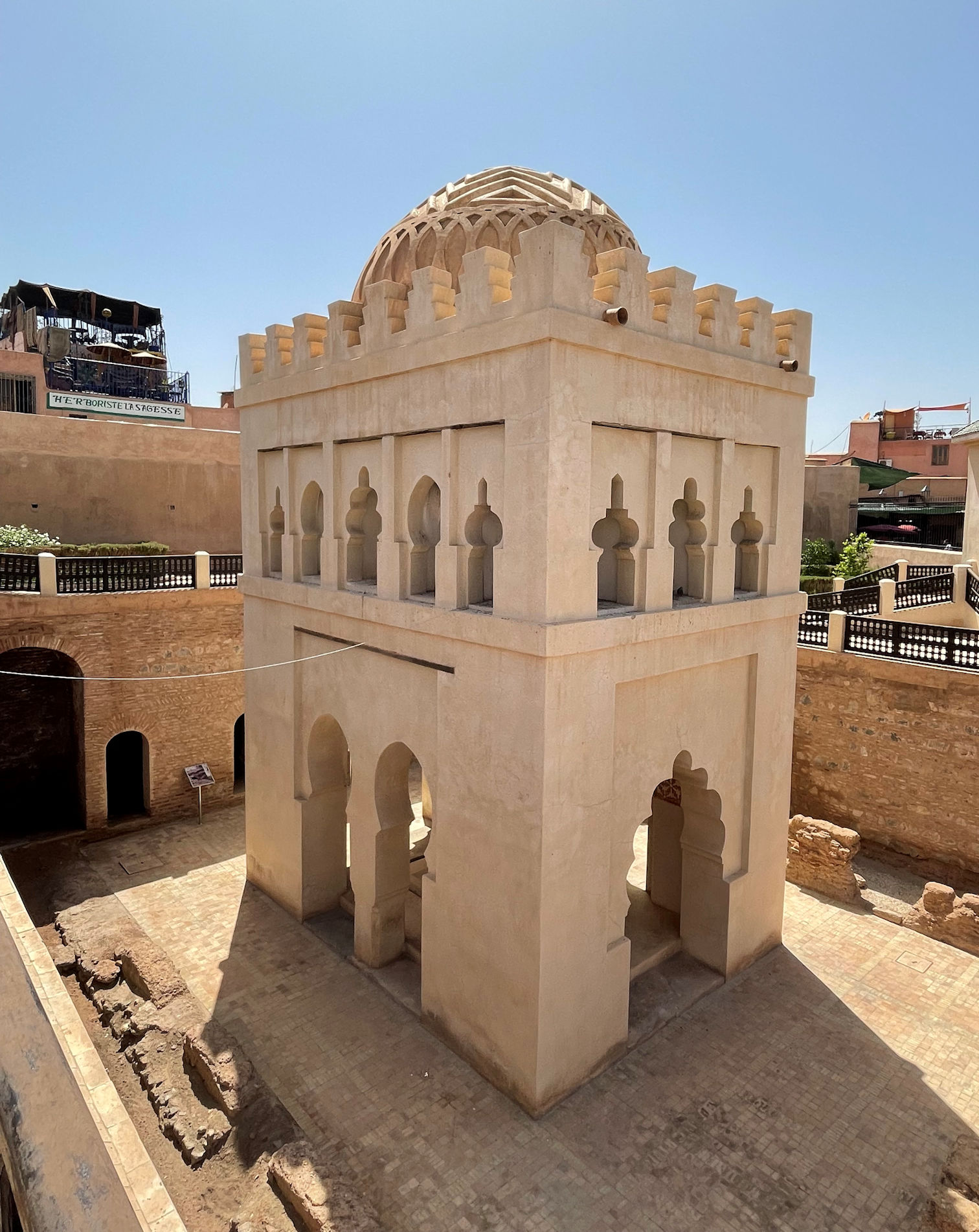
- Interactive map of Almoravid Qubba
- 31.6315°N 7.9872°W
- Type: pavilion or mosque annex
- Location: Marrakesh, Morocco

History
- Founder: Ali ibn Yusuf
- Built: 1 August 1117 or 6 May 1125
- Original use: ablutions pavilion

Site notes
- Architectural style: Moorish (Almoravid)

The Almoravid Qubba (Arabic: القبة المرابطية), (Note: The word Qubba, an Arabic word (قبة) meaning "dome", can also be spelled Qoubba or Koubba, based on French transliterations.) also known as the Qubbat al-Ba'diyyin or Qubbat al-Barudiyyin, is a small monument in Marrakesh, Morocco. It was erected by the Almoravid dynasty in the early 12th century. It is notable for its extraordinary decoration and for being one of the only remnants of Almoravid architecture in Marrakesh.

== History ==
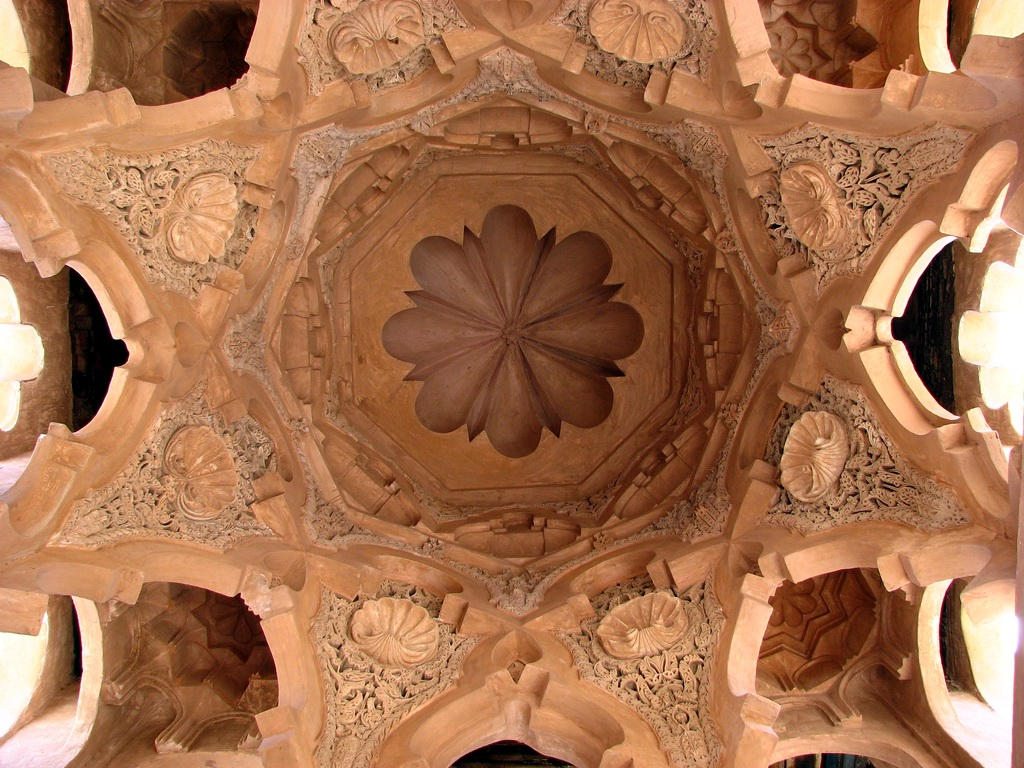
Inside the cupola of the domed pavilion (prior to recent restoration)

The Almoravid Qubba is situated next to the Marrakech Museum and around 40 meters south of the Mosque of Ben Youssef. It is the only surviving example of Almoravid architecture in Marrakesh. Its inscription states it was built on Wednesday, 30th Rabi I by the Almoravid ruler Ali ibn Yusuf. But the year is missing, giving four options, the most plausible of which being either 1 August 1117 or, more likely, 6 May 1125. Scholars have generally accepted that it belonged to the nearby Ben Youssef Mosque, the main mosque of the city at the time, and that it was a pavilion used for ritual ablutions before prayer. The mosque itself, also originally built by Ali ibn Yusuf, has since been completely rebuilt in more recent centuries. This type of structure for providing water near a mosque was also known as a mida'a (Arabic: ميضأة; "ablutions facility") and is found in later mosques in Marrakesh.

In modern times, the existence of the Qubba was first documented by French scholars in 1947, with architectural historian Boris Maslow publishing notes about it in 1948. In the following years, more thorough excavations and studies were carried out under the direction of Henri Terrasse and Jacques Meunié. Due to the rising ground level and the construction of other structures around it, over half of the Qubba was buried under 7–8 meters of debris. The French scholars refrained from any significant reconstruction or restoration, leaving the structure essentially as found, and published their findings in the 1950s. In the decades since its excavation it has become a historic monument and tourist attraction.

== Description ==
=== The domed pavilion ===
The dome (qubba) tops a rectangular building, measuring 7.35 by 5.45 meters, sheltering a water basin. The whole structure is 12 meters tall. Materials used include stone, brick, and cedar wood. The interior is richly decorated with carved floral and vegetal patterns (pine cones, palms and acanthus leaves), palmette/seashell shapes, and calligraphy. Its cupola has been compared to the domes of the Great Mosque of Cordoba and the Bab al-Mardum Mosque in Toledo (both older buildings from Andalusi Umayyad architecture).

In the corners, between the wings of the cupola and the rectangular outer walls, are four miniature cupolas carved with some of the earliest muqarnas decoration in Morocco. Since muqarnas decoration would have originated in Abbasid architecture in the Middle East, at least one scholar has suggested that this combination of Cordoban Umayyad and Abbasid motifs was a deliberate stylistic choice by the Almoravid ruler to invoke a shared legacy and heritage with these caliphates.

Around the interior of the pavilion is an Arabic inscription, now badly damaged, which details the foundation of the structure and cites the name of Ali ibn Yusuf and the date of construction, although the year of the date is unfortunately unreadable (leading to scholarly debate about the exact date).

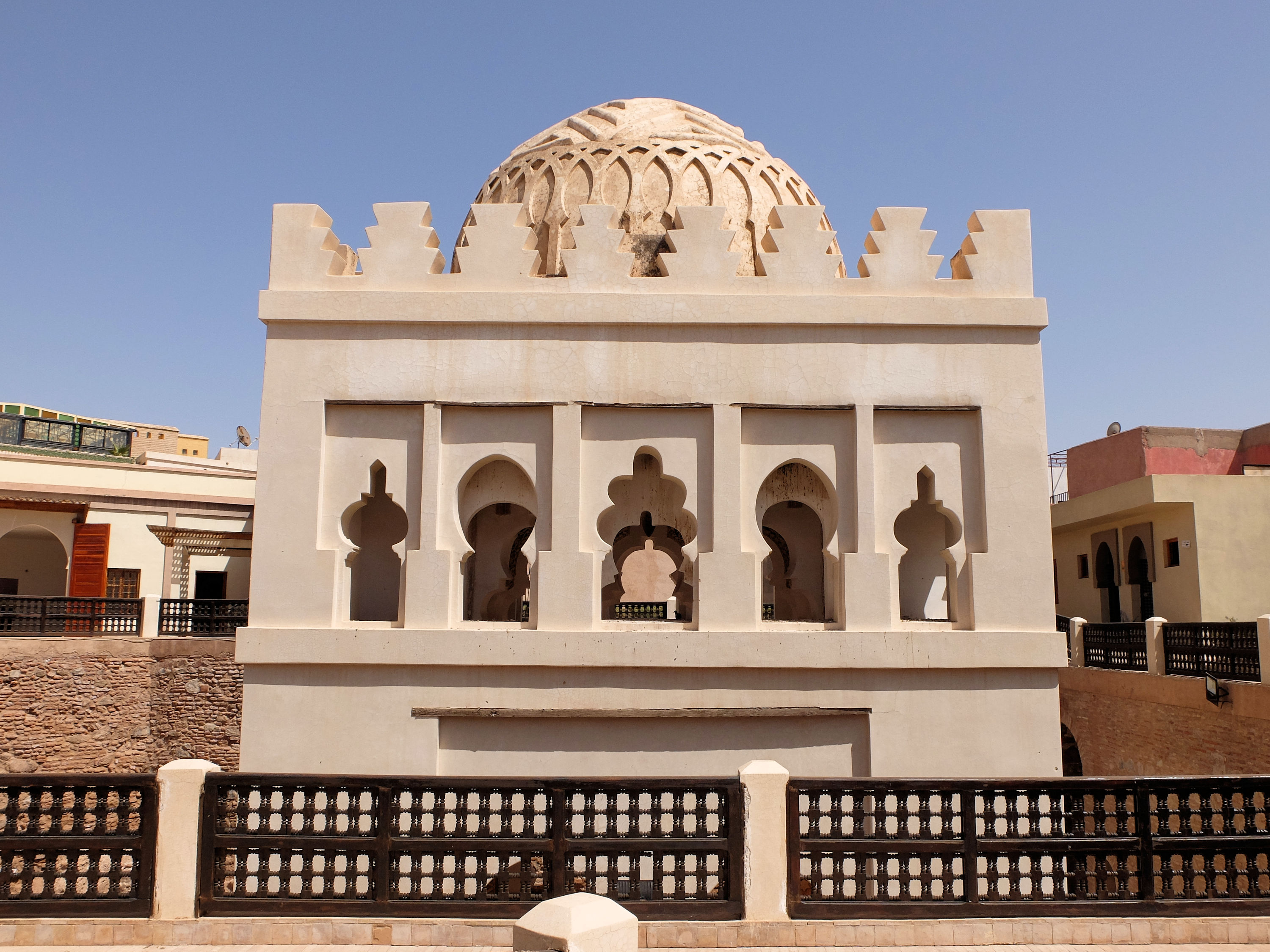
View of upper section and windows

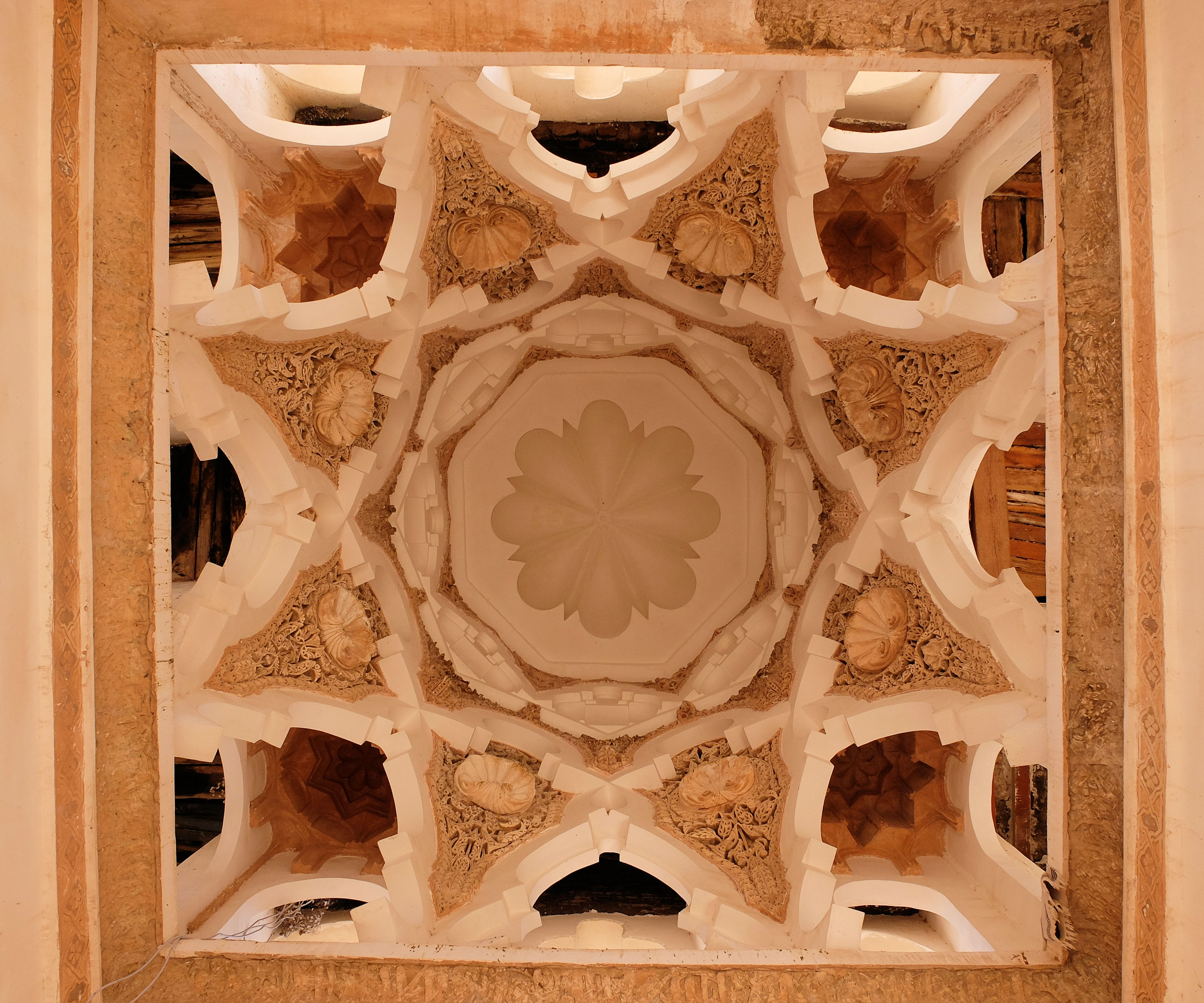
Interior of the main cupola

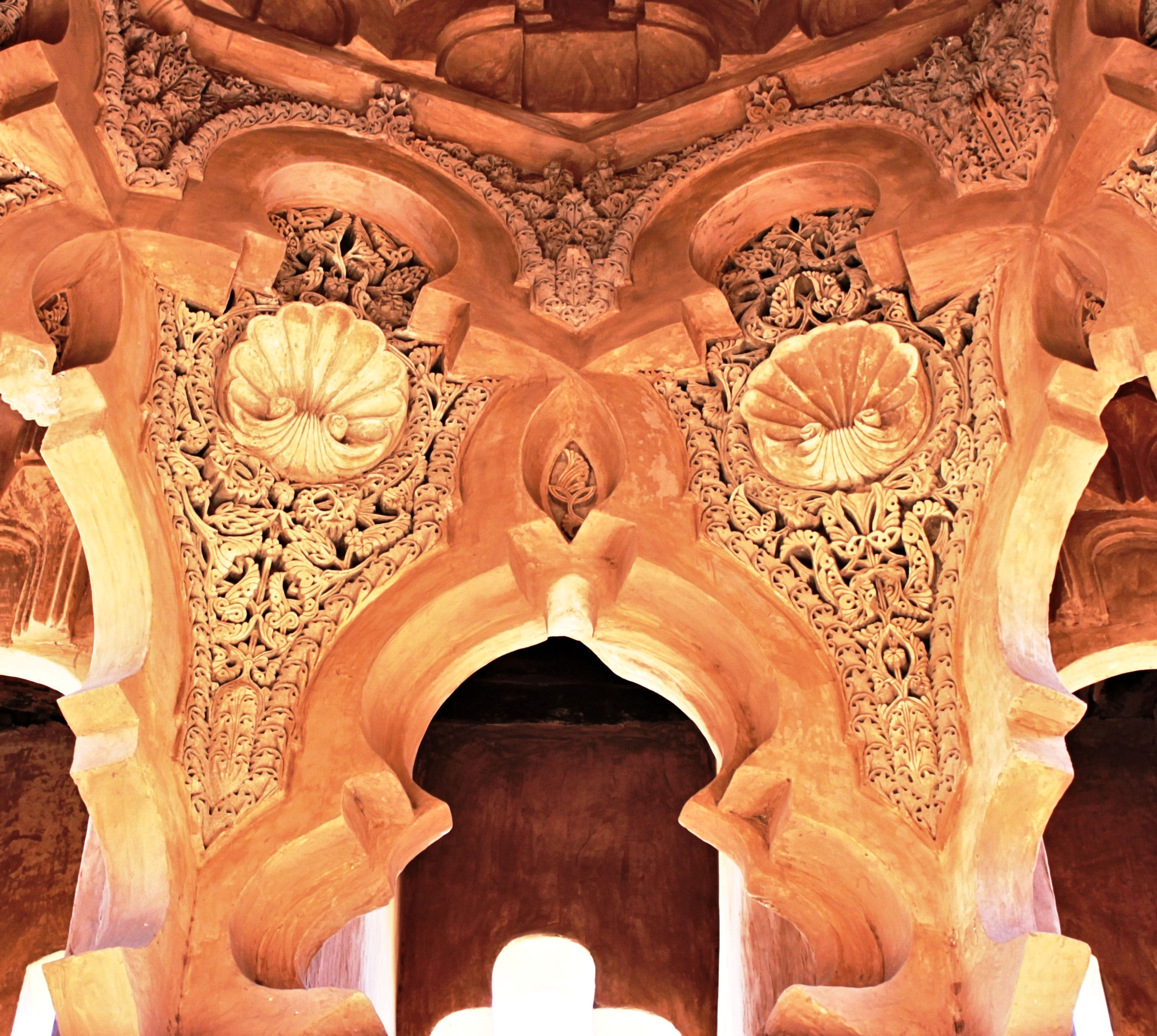
Details of the decoration inside the cupola.

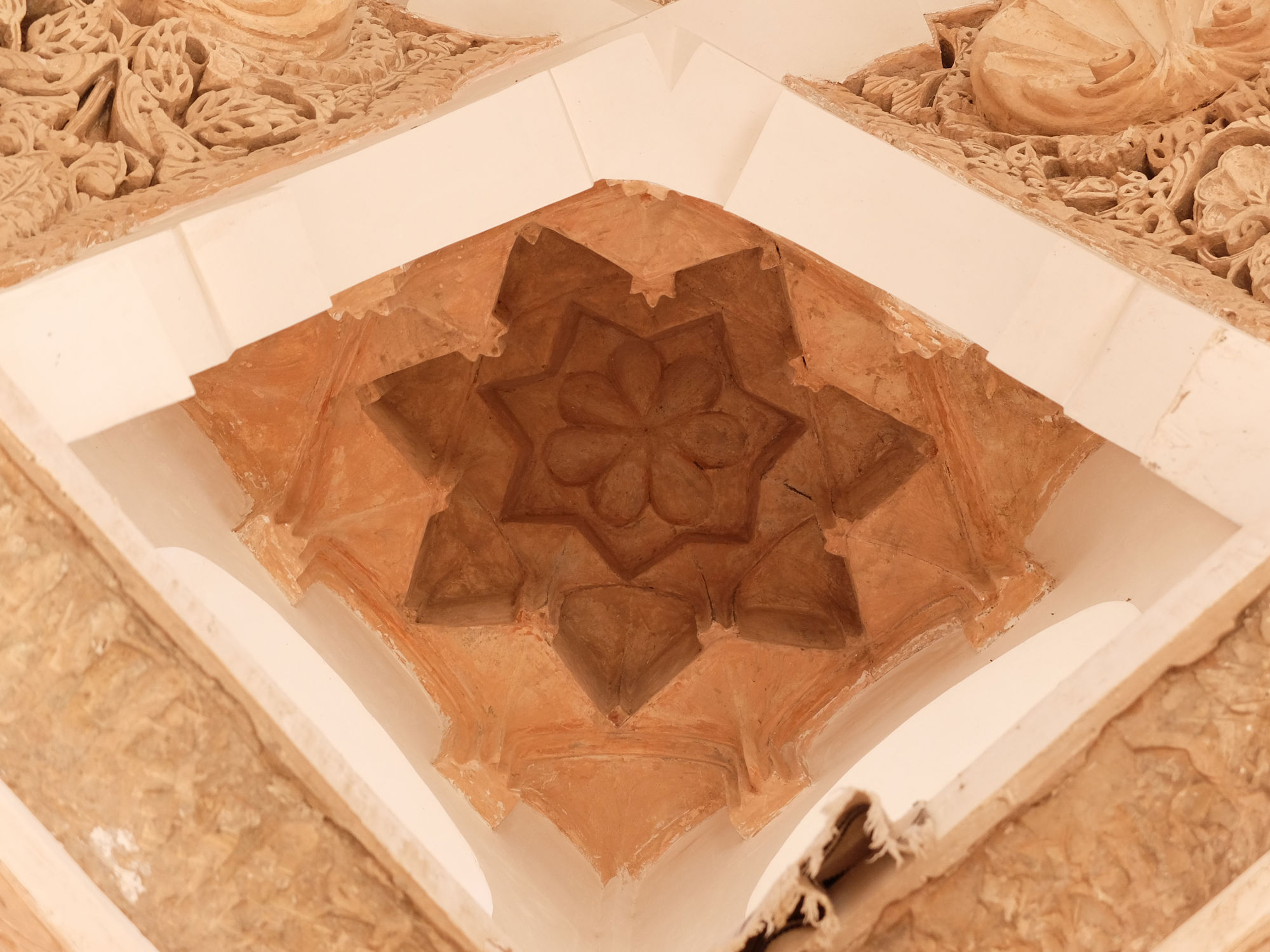
One of the small muqarnas cupolas in the four corners

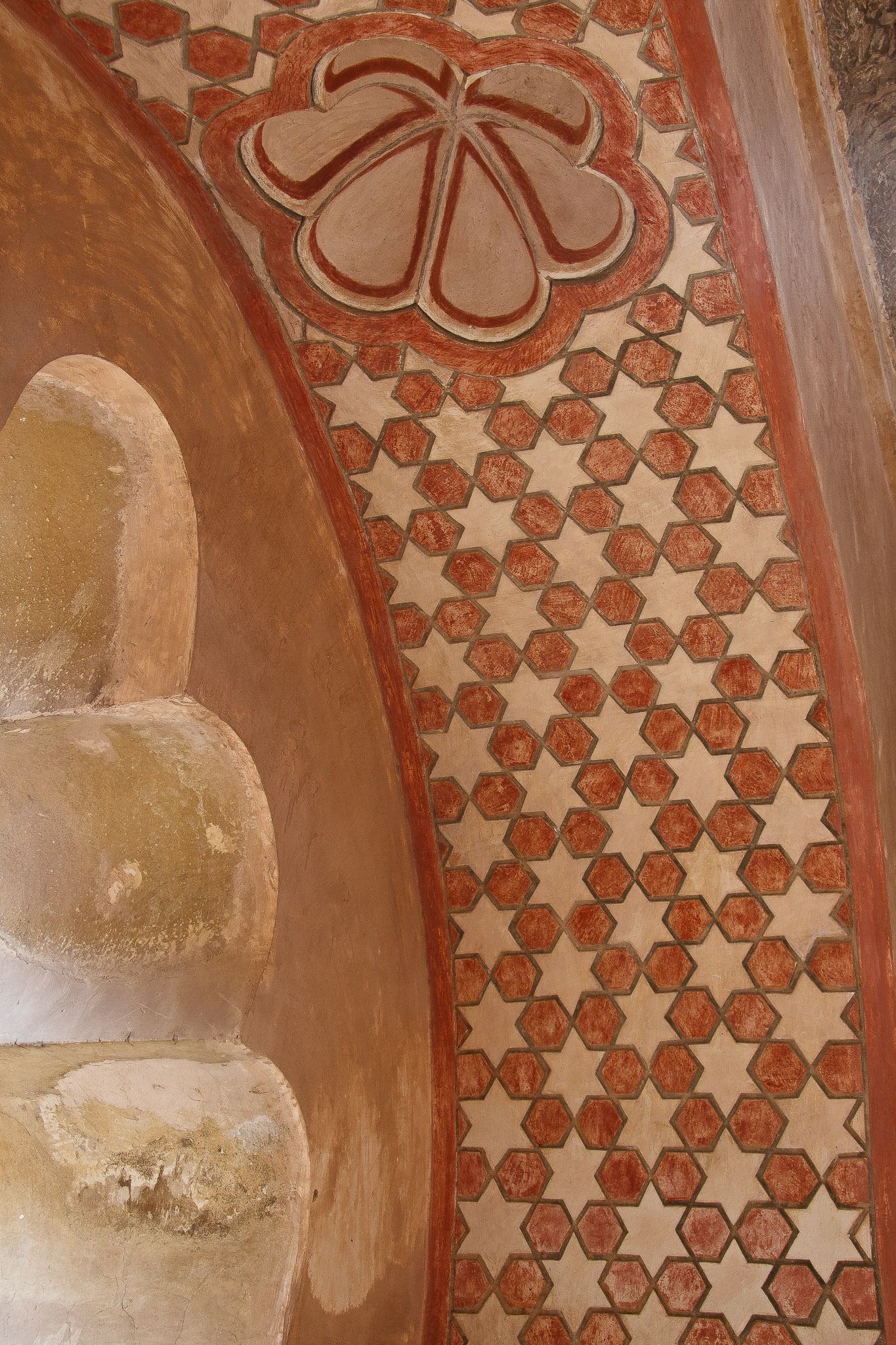
Decoration on the arches around the inner edge of the pavilion

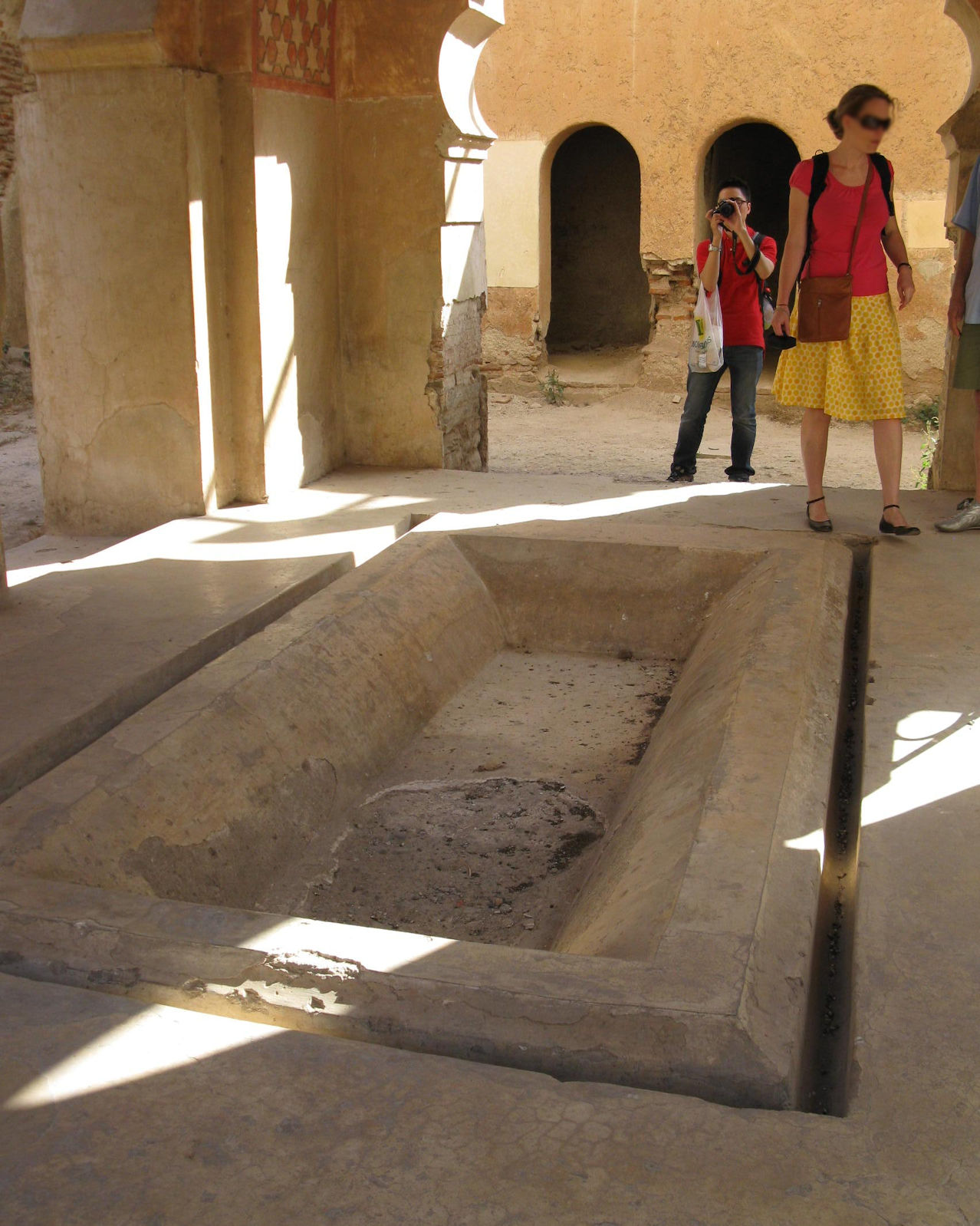
Water basin under the dome; the basin is surrounded by a thin trench where spilled water could be drained

=== Other structures around the pavilion ===
A series of private latrines, possibly built at a later period, have also been excavated all around the domed building. Next to the domed building was also a monumental fountain or water source in another rectangular structure measuring around 14.5 by 4.5 meters. The structure was open to the street via three arched openings, with each bay occupied by a water basin and a water trough along its back wall. This fountain structure is reminiscent, in its basic form, of later wall fountains of Marrakesh like those of the Mouassine Mosque or of the Shrob ou Shouf Fountain.

The water for this fountain and the ablutions kiosk was drawn via bronze pipes from a nearby cistern covered by a barrel vault, which can be found today behind these structures. The supply of water to this cistern probably relied in turn on the revolutionary hydraulics of khettaras, a drainage system characteristic of historic Morocco.

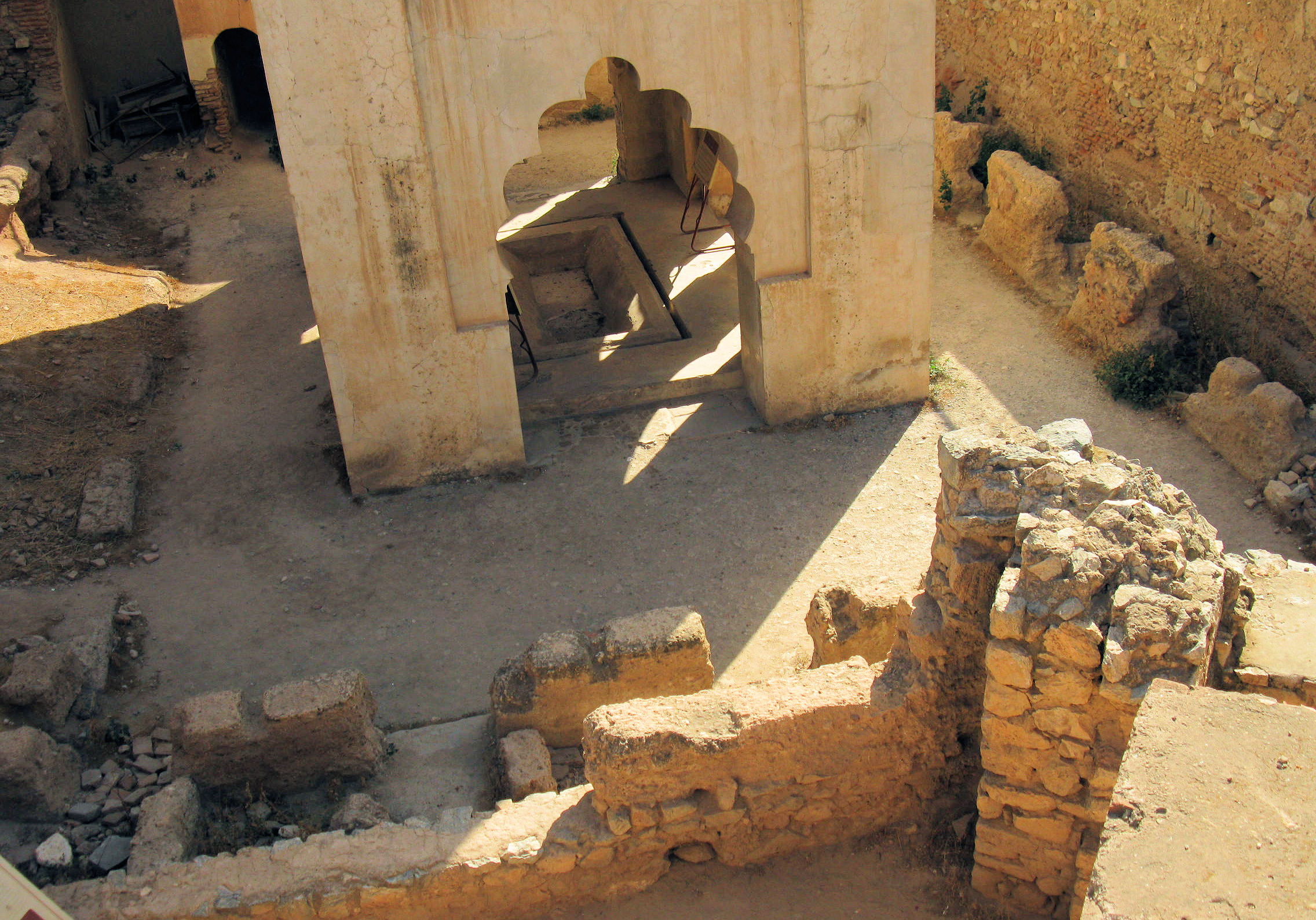
Base of the Almoravid pavilion, with remains of private latrines surrounding it

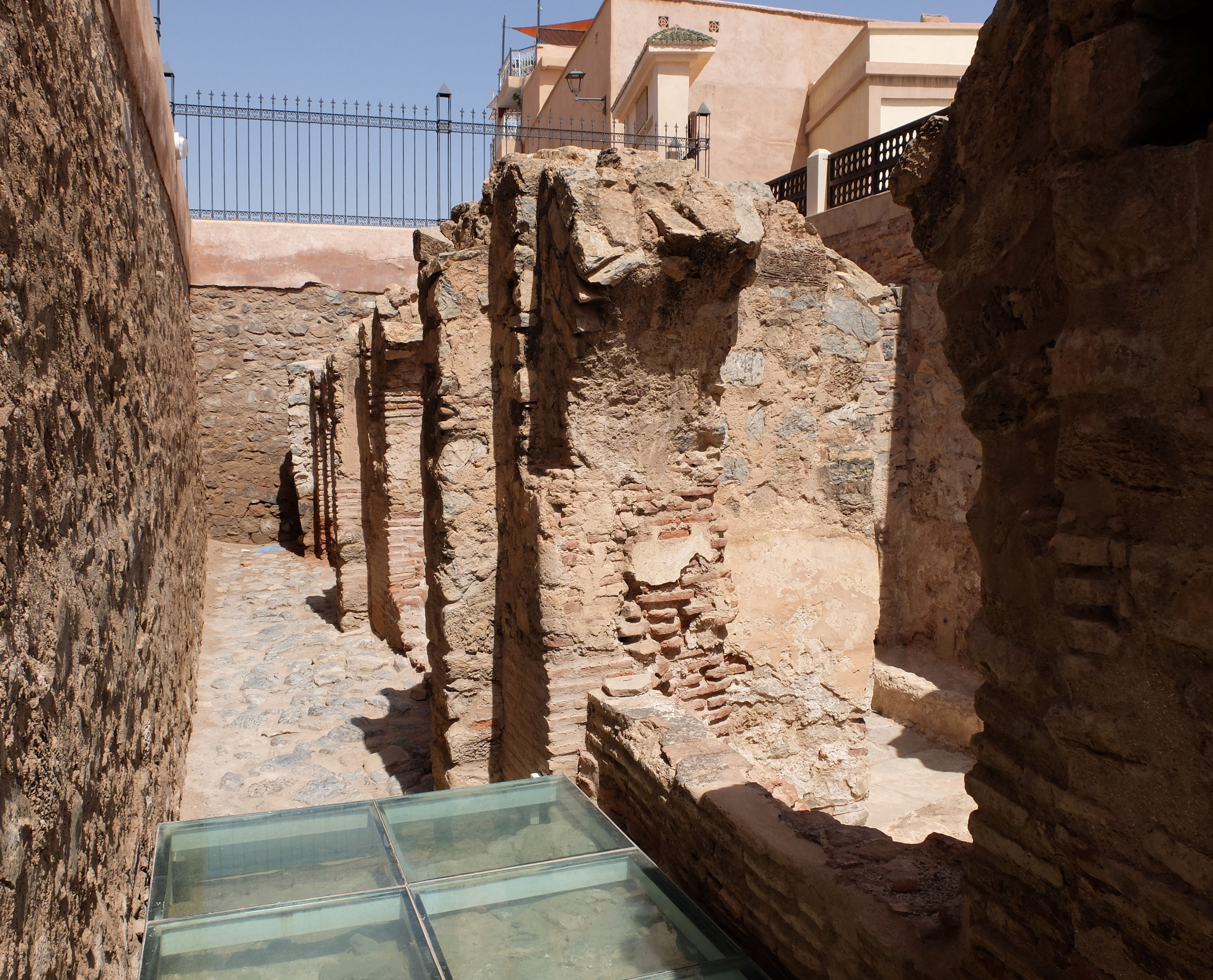
Remains of the triple-arched fountain structure next to the qubba

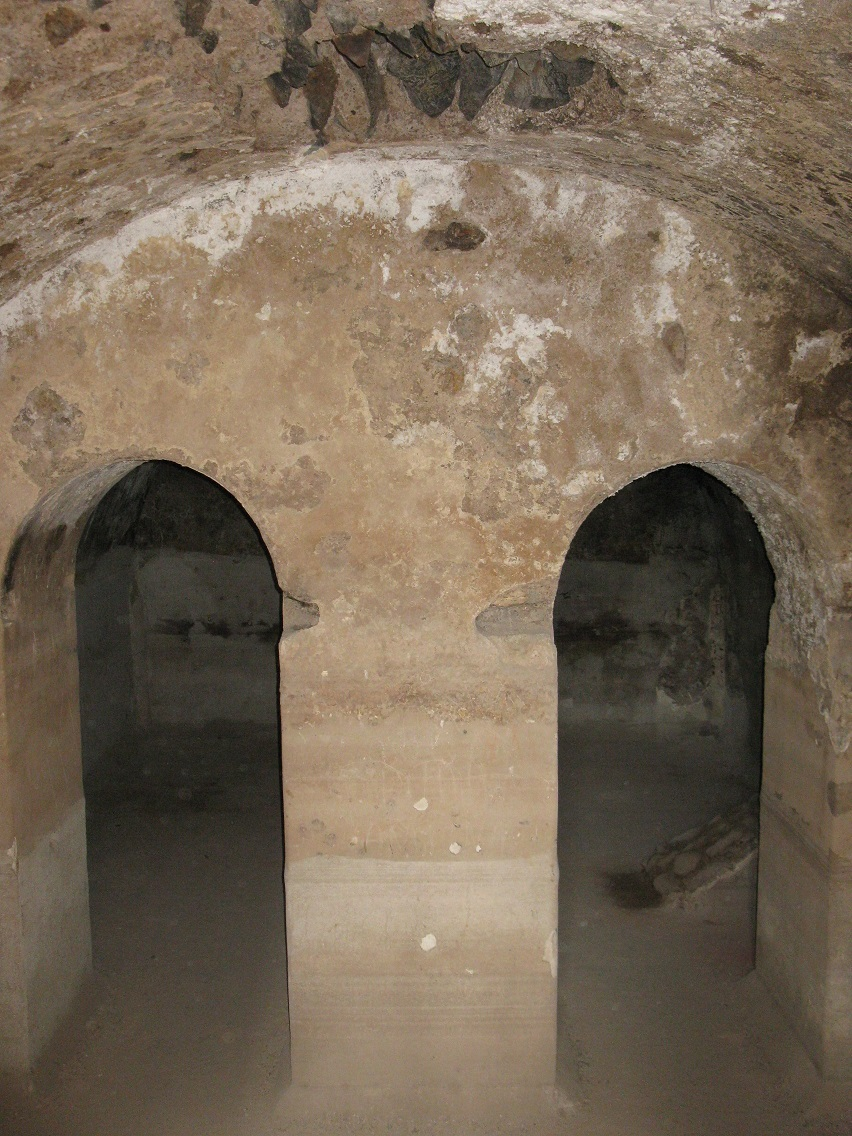
Inside the cistern behind the fountain

== See also ==
- High medieval domes
- Symbolism of domes
