= Menara Mall =

Shopping mall in Marrakesh, Morocco

Coordinates: 31.62°N 8.01°W

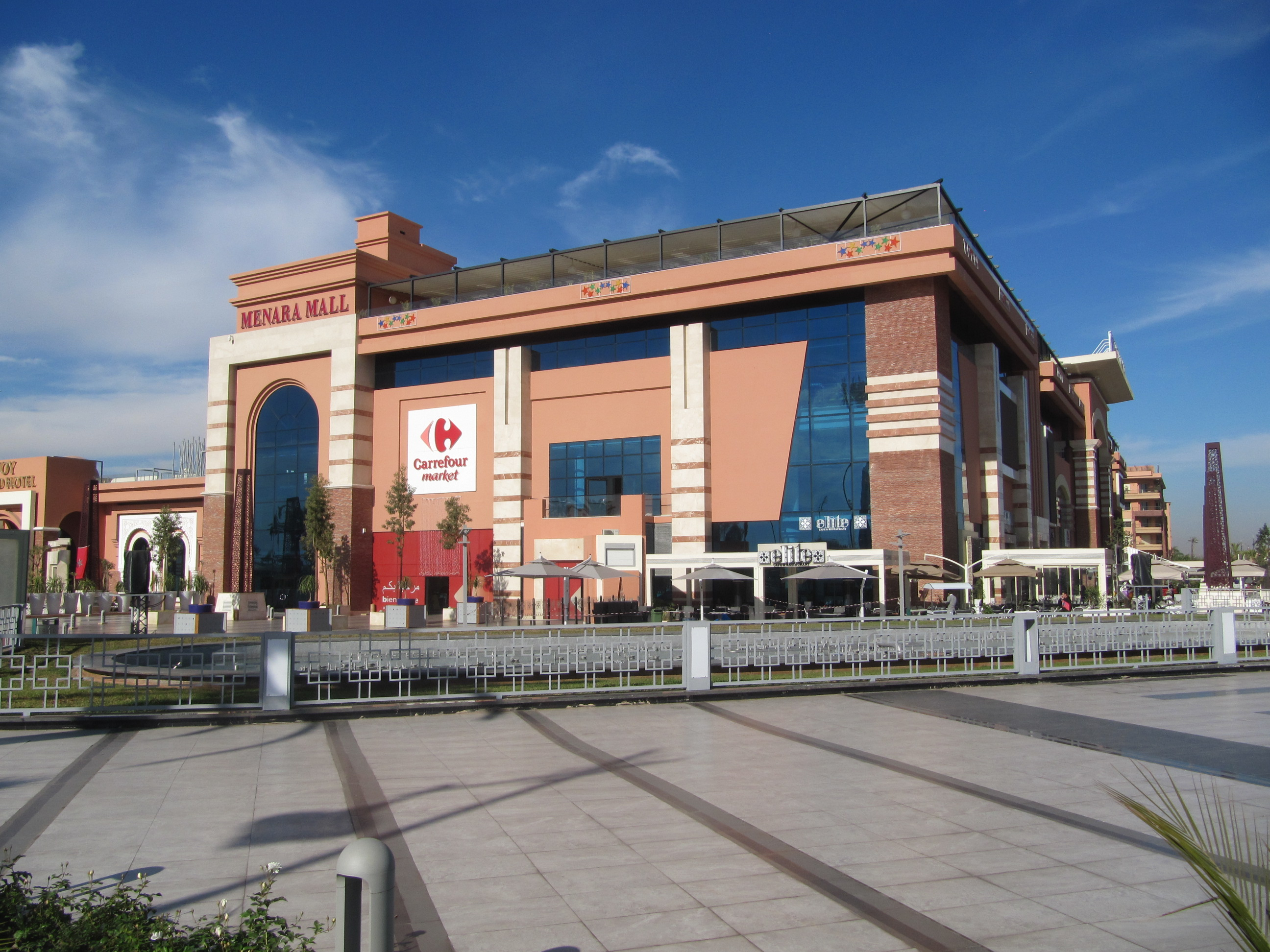
Menara Mall, Marrakesh

Menara Mall is one of the largest shopping centres in Marrakesh, Morocco. Opened in June 2015, the mall is located in the upscale district of Hivernage. It has five floors, including the basement, and a total surface area of 50,000 square metres (540,000 sq ft), with the topmost floor dedicated as an indoor attraction park for children called "Kidzo". The biggest tenant is Carrefour, which operates in the basement (Carrefour Market) and ground floors (Carrefour). The mall is directly connected to Savoy Le Grand Hotel Marrakech, a five-star hotel operated by the Egypt-based Pickalbatros Hotels & Resorts.
