= Arab Astronomical Society =

Arab astronomical non-profit society

The Arab Astronomical Society (ArAS) الجمعية الفلكية العربية is a non-profit learned society that aims to advance astronomy and related sciences in the Arab world. Additionally, it seeks to support astronomical scholarship, technological development, education, and the spread of astronomical knowledge. It operates the Arab Astronomical Society School of Astrophysics (ArAS SfA).

The ArAS was founded in Marrakech, Morocco on November 30, 2016, legally recognized in Morocco in May 2017, and incorporated as a non-profit organization in the US in 2018.

Presently, the Society is working on establishing personal and material scientific infrastructure in the Arab world by training advanced undergraduate and graduate students in astrophysics and stimulating the building of new telescopes.
