= Glaoui Palace =

Glaoui Palace may refer to several palaces used by the Glaoui family in Morocco:

- Dar el Bacha, the palace of the Glaouis in Marrakesh
- Dar Glaoui, the palace of the Glaouis in Fez
- Telouet Kasbah, the palace of the Glaouis in the High Atlas mountains
- Kasbah Taourirt, an older palace used by the Glaouis in Ouarzazate
