= 1953 Oujda revolt =

1953 revolt in Oujda, Morocco

Oujda (Morocco)

The 1953 Oujda revolt (Arabic: انتفاضة 16 غشت 1953, French: La tuerie d'Oujda, lit. 'The Oujda massacre') was an anti-colonial revolt against the French protectorate, in the context of the Revolution of the King and the People, that took place in Oujda August 16, 1953. It was followed by a second insurrection in Tafoughalt the next day.

It came ten days after an "electoral tour" procession by Thami El Glaoui, who was campaigning to overthrow Sultan Muhammad V.

== Aftermath ==
The dead included European members of the "service d'ordre", Moroccans known to support Thami El Glaoui, and protesters. 96 Moroccans were prosecuted for their involvement.
