= Bacha Coffee =

International coffee brand

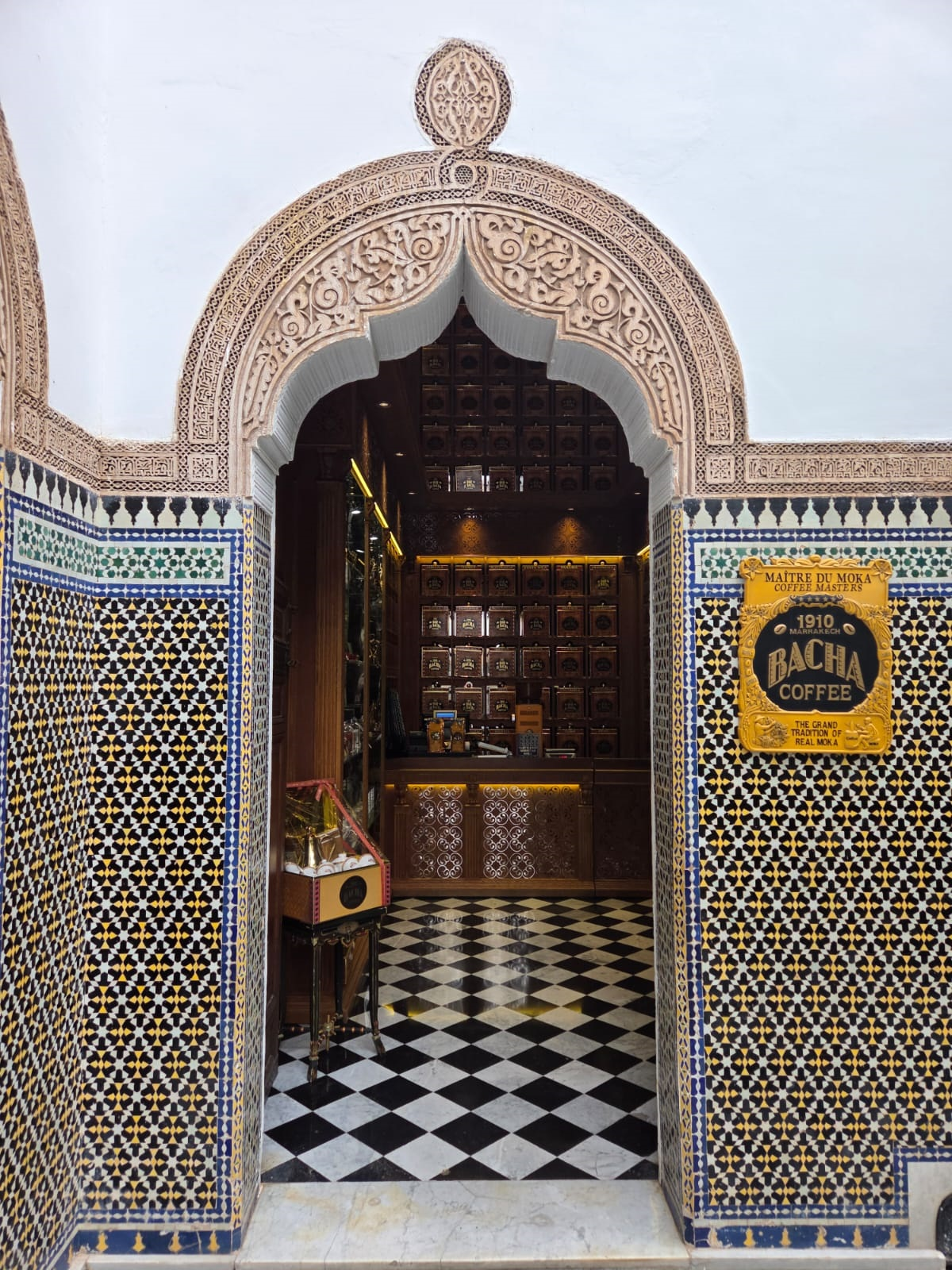
- Entrance to the Bacha Coffee boutique in Marrakesh, Morocco
- Industry: Coffee, Luxury Retail
- Headquarters: Marrakesh, Morocco
- Key people: Taha Bouqdib, CEO; Maranda Barnes, CCO
- Parent: V3 Gourmet
- Website: bachacoffee.com

Bacha Coffee is an international coffee brand that originated in Marrakesh, Morocco in a coffee shop in Dar el Bacha. It offers over 200 varieties of 100% Arabica coffee and is currently part of V3 Gourmet.

== History ==
Bacha Coffee traces its origins to 1910 in Marrakesh, Morocco within the stately buildings of Dar el Bacha where coffea arabica was traditionally brewed. The coffee house had hosted notable figures such as Colette, Franklin D. Roosevelt, and Winston Churchill.

The National Foundation of the Museums of Morocco began restoration of a portion of the Dar el Bacha, reopening it as a museum in 2017. Taha Bouqdib took on the task of renovating the original coffee room, officially re-opening it as Bacha Coffee in 2019. It later opened coffee rooms in Hong Kong, Qatar, Kuwait, and Malaysia. By 2024, it had coffee rooms, retail counters, and coffee boutiques. It opened its first European flagship in 2025 with the opening of its location on the Champs-Élysées in Paris, France.

== Products ==
Bacha Coffee offers over 200 varieties of single-origin 100% Arabica, fine blended coffees, fine flavoured coffees, and decaffeinated coffees through its website and retail locations. It also sells pastries and coffee accessories.
