= André Suréda =

French painter

André Suréda (5 June 1872, Versailles - 7 January 1930, Versailles) was a French painter, designer, engraver and illustrator. He was married to the artist, Alice Dumas.

== Biography ==
He came from a noble Spanish family. His great-grandfather, Don Bartolomé Sureda y Miserol, had his portrait painted by Francisco de Goya in 1805.

He studied at the Lycée Henri-IV in Paris; then at the École nationale supérieure des beaux-arts, where his primary instructor was Tony Robert-Fleury. He was awarded a scholarship there in 1904. After 1910, he painted Orientalist scenes, exclusively.

From 1902 to 1925, he was a regular exhibitor at the Salon of the Société nationale des beaux-arts. He also participated in the colonial expositions of 1906 and 1922. He was a frequent traveler to North Africa, where he made the acquaintance of the sculptor, Georges Hilbert. In 1927, he presented several works at the Machine-Age Exposition in New York. Two years later, he provided illustrations for Au soleil, a travel book by Guy de Maupassant. He also illustrated two works by Jean and Jérôme Tharaud; Marrakech ou les seigneurs de l’Atlas (1924), with engravings by François-Louis Schmied, and L'An prochain à Jérusalem (1929), engraved by Georges Beltrand.

His works may be seen at the Musée Lambinet, the Musée Rolin in Autun, and the Ahmed Zabana National Museum in Oran.

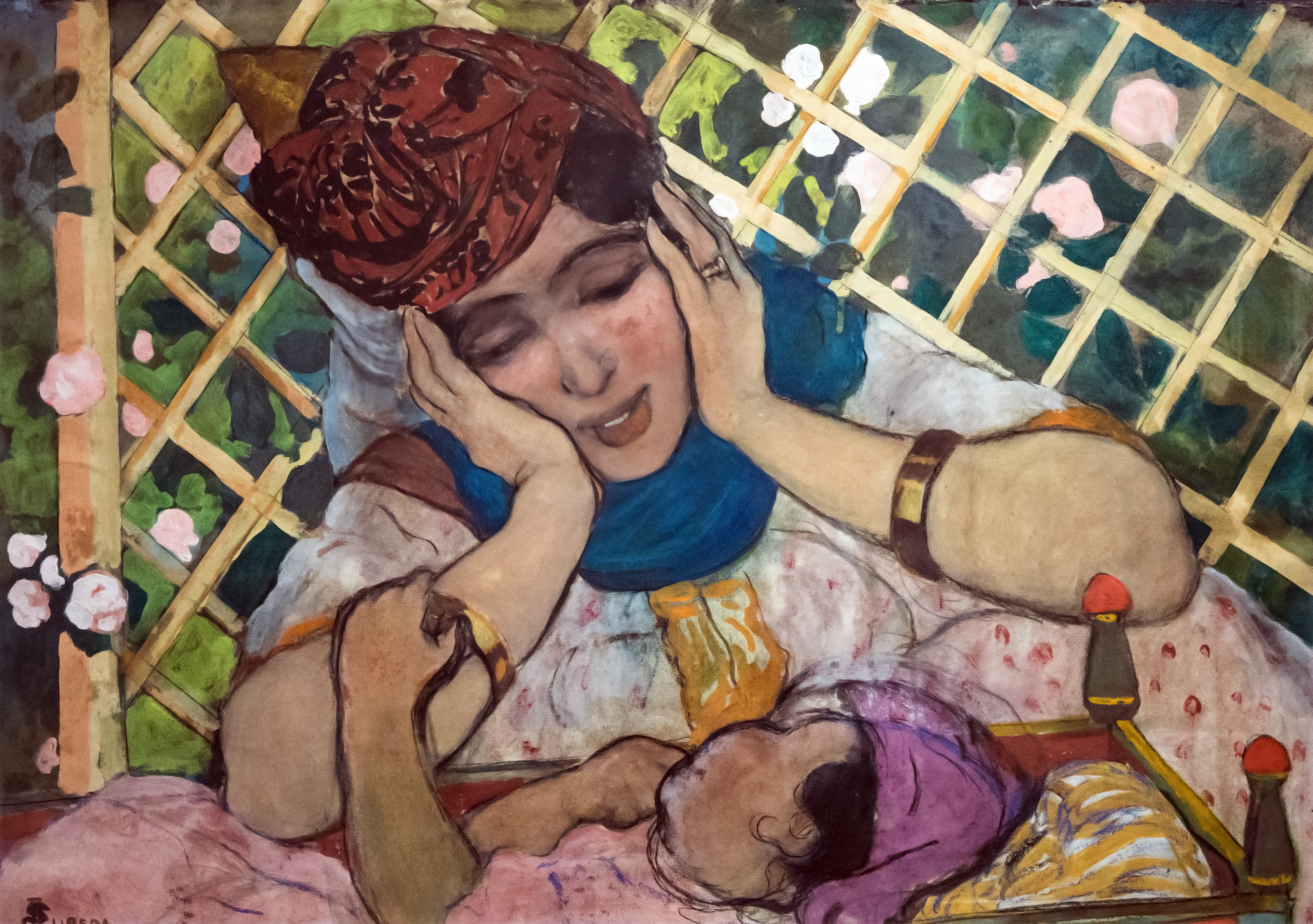
Young woman admiring her child

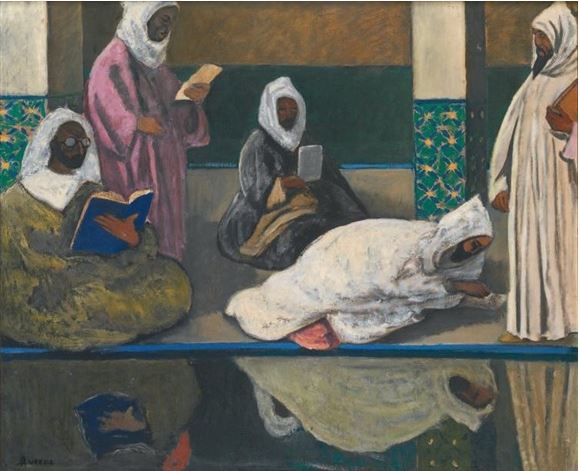
The Quranic School

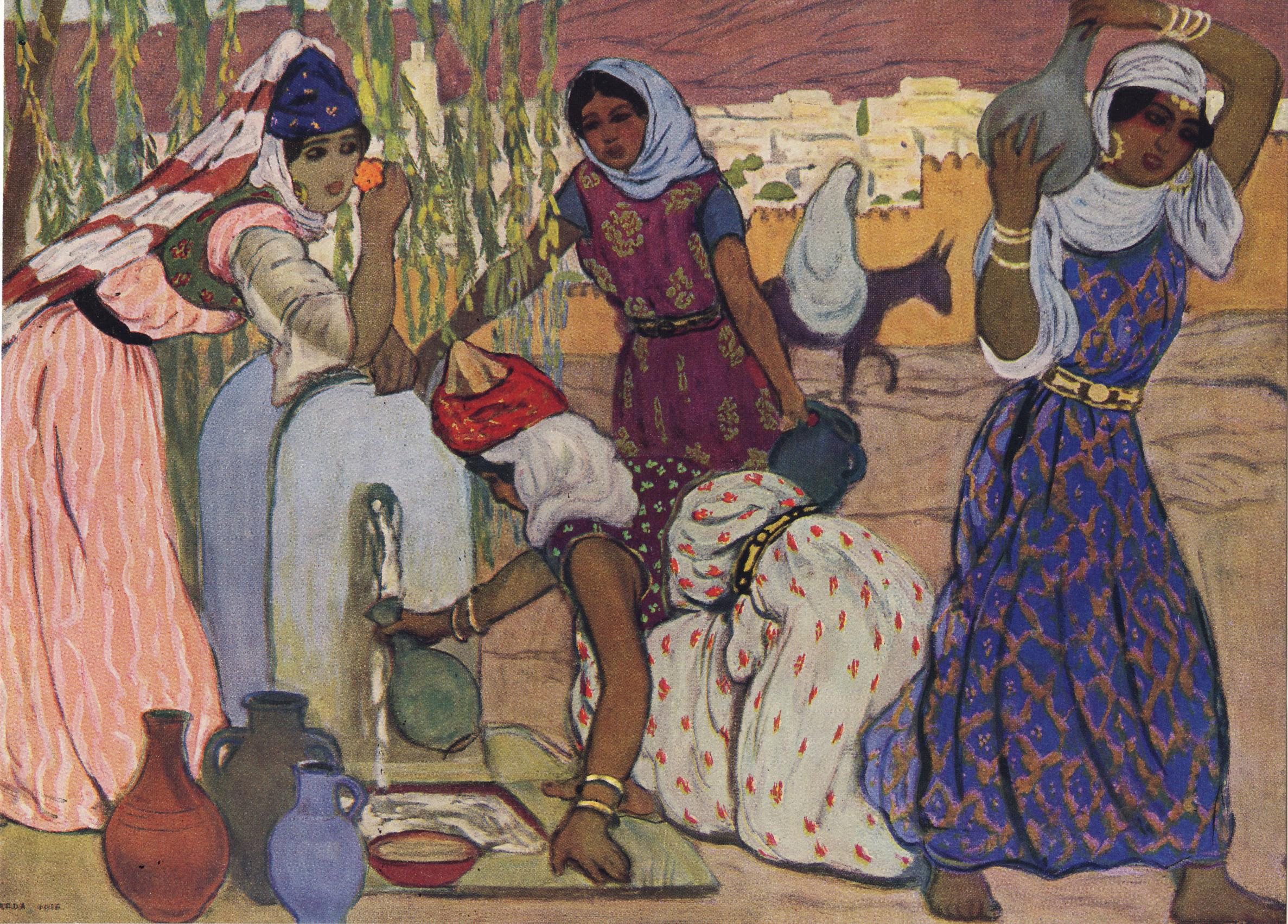
Women at the Fountain

== Sources ==
- Exhibition Catalogue from the Musée Lambinet, June–July 1983
- Hamid Nacer-Khodja, "Le peintre orientaliste Andréa Suréda, générosité d'un talent", in El Watan, October 2007
- Exhibition Catalogue from the Musée Rolin, June–October 2008
