= Dar Glaoui =

Palace in Fez, Morocco

Coordinates: 34°03′33.1″N 4°58′37.7″W

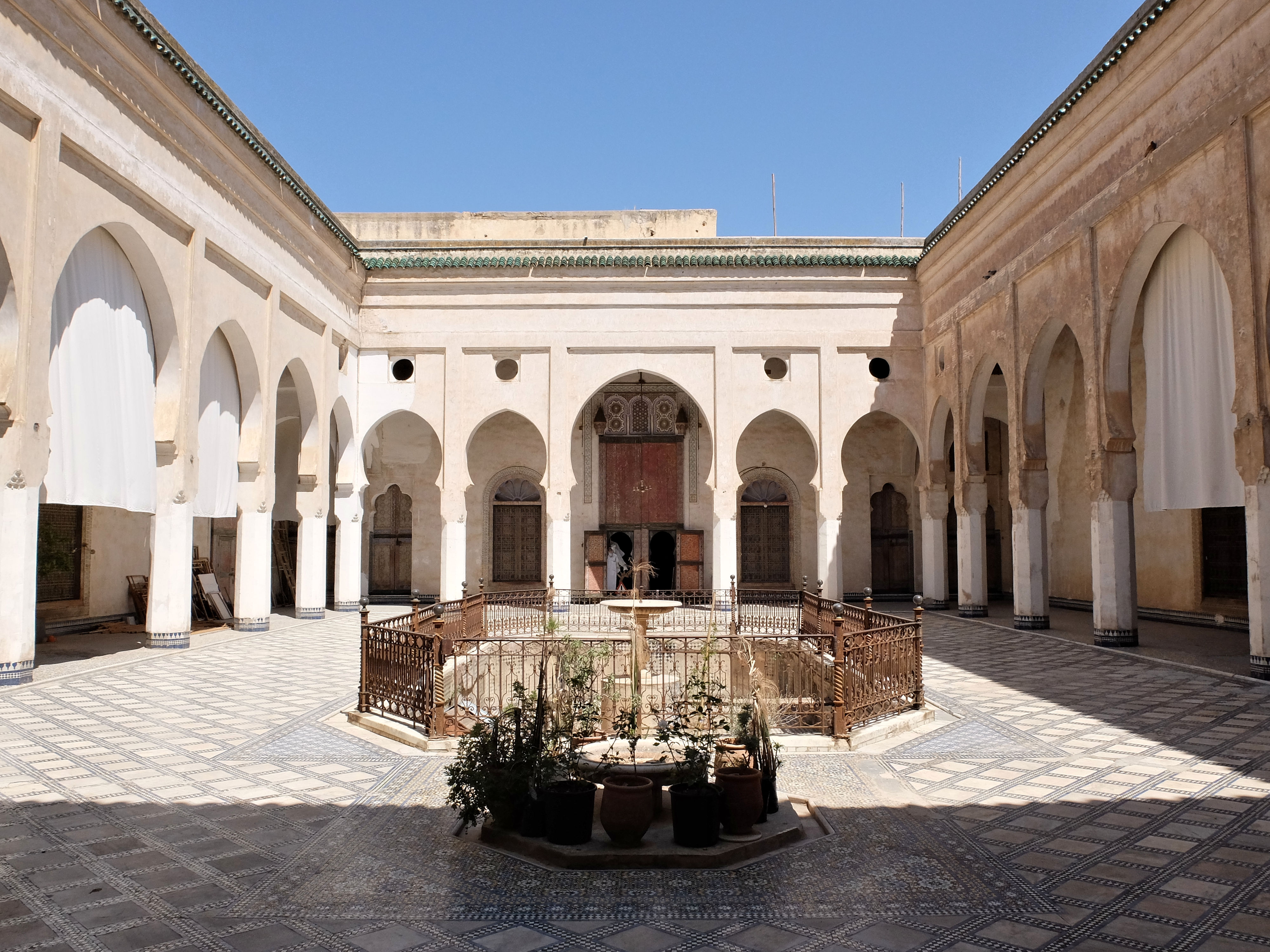
Courtyard of the palace

Dar Glaoui or Glaoui Palace (Arabic: دار لكلاوي; sometimes called by its French name, Palais Glaoui) is a late 19th-century and early 20th-century palace in Fez, Morocco. It was owned by the Glaoui family, whose most famous members were the Grand Vizier Madani and his brother Thami, pasha of Marrakech. The palace is located in the southwestern district of Fes el-Bali, in an area containing other historic mansions.

== History ==
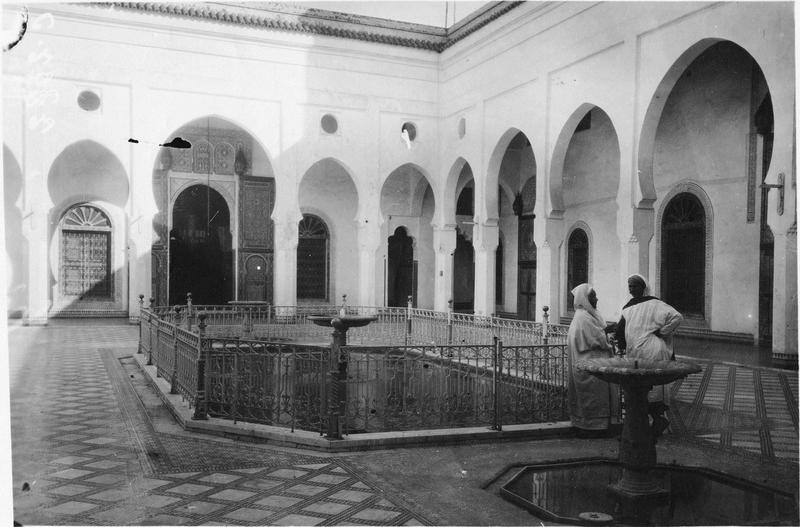
The main courtyard of the Dar Glaoui (photo from 1916)

The Glaoui family (also transliterated as Glawi) was one of the most powerful political clans in Morocco in the later 19th century and in the first half of the 20th century, having risen to prominent positions of power under Muhammad IV and subsequent sultans. The same family had also constructed a lavish kasbah and fortified residence in Telouet, in the High Atlas, starting in 1860. During the Hafidiya civil war, the head of the clan, Madani Glaoui, turned against Sultan Abdelaziz by supporting his brother Abd al-Hafid. After winning the throne, Abd al-Hafid rewarded Madani with high offices including vizier. Madani's younger brother, Thami, was appointed Pasha of Marrakesh, a title he ultimately kept under French Protectorate rule until 1956, during which time he acted as the strongman of southern Morocco. Madani died in 1918.

Upon Abd al-Hafid and Madani's triumph in 1907, Madani had seized many of the properties of Haj Omar Tazi, the former finance minister of Sultan Abdelaziz. One of these was a palace in Fez, now the Dar Glaoui. Tazi had built this palace in the second half of the 19th century. The palace is sometimes attributed by writers to Thami el Glaoui, (Note: According to Salah Stétié, it was the Pacha of Marrakesh (Thami el Glaoui) who seized the palace from Tazi. Amal Cavender, in a PhD thesis on the late architectural history of Fez, attributes the palace's construction to Thami el Glaoui around the end of the 19th century.) though according to Abbderrahman El Mezouari El Glaoui (Madani's grandson) this is a mistake. The Glaouis built other palaces across Morocco during the late 19th and early 20th centuries, including the Kasbah of Telouet and the Dar el Bacha in Marrakesh.

The palace is located in what was the al-'Uyun ("the [water] Sources") neighbourhood of Fes el-Bali, known today as the Ziat or Ziyat neighbourhood, which until the 19th century had been a garden district with relatively plenty of open space to build, thus attracting the construction of several new mansions by wealthy families such as the Dar Moqri and the Dar Tazi. The Dar Glaoui in Fez was also the first building in Morocco to have electricity and heating.

When the French occupied Fez after 1911, the palace served temporarily as the residence of the French plenipotentiary Eugène Regnault. After this, it was occupied for a time by the French resident-general, Hubert Lyautey. After Morocco regained its independence in 1956, Thami El Glaoui, was stripped of his status by King Mohammed V and the Glaoui palaces fell into neglect. The Dar Glaoui today is still privately owned but partly dilapidated.

== Architecture ==
The mansion was a palatial complex with as many as twelve houses and numerous annexes and facilities including hammams, Qur'anic schools, stables, a cemetery, and large gardens. The largest section of the complex is centered around a large interior courtyard which has a central rectangular pool with a central fountain, flanked by two other fountains rising from smaller water basins. The palace's decoration reflects the wealth of the Glaoui family and features the best of Moroccan craftsmanship at the time, such as zellij tiling, painted wood, and carved stucco.

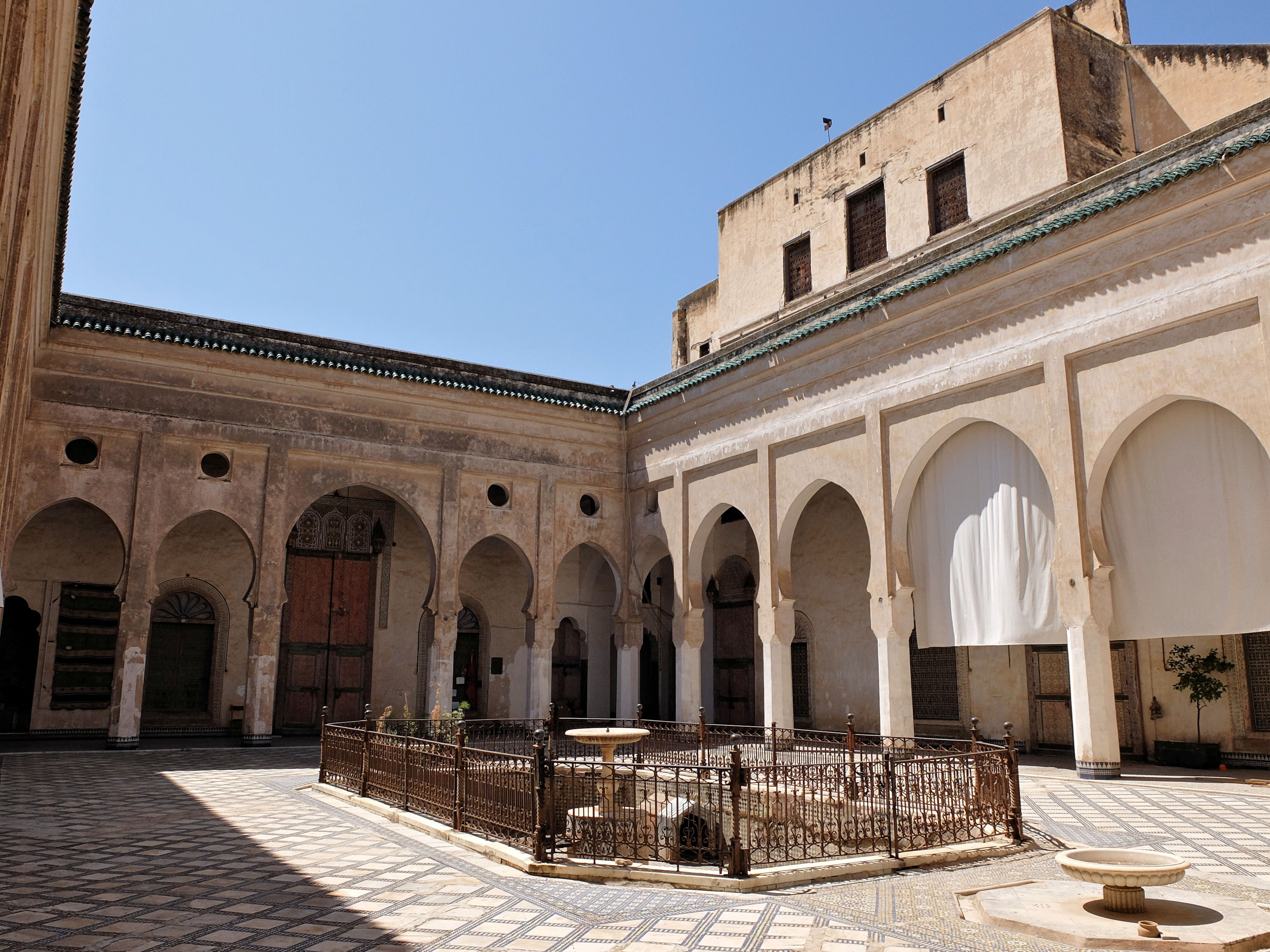
The first or eastern courtyard of the palace

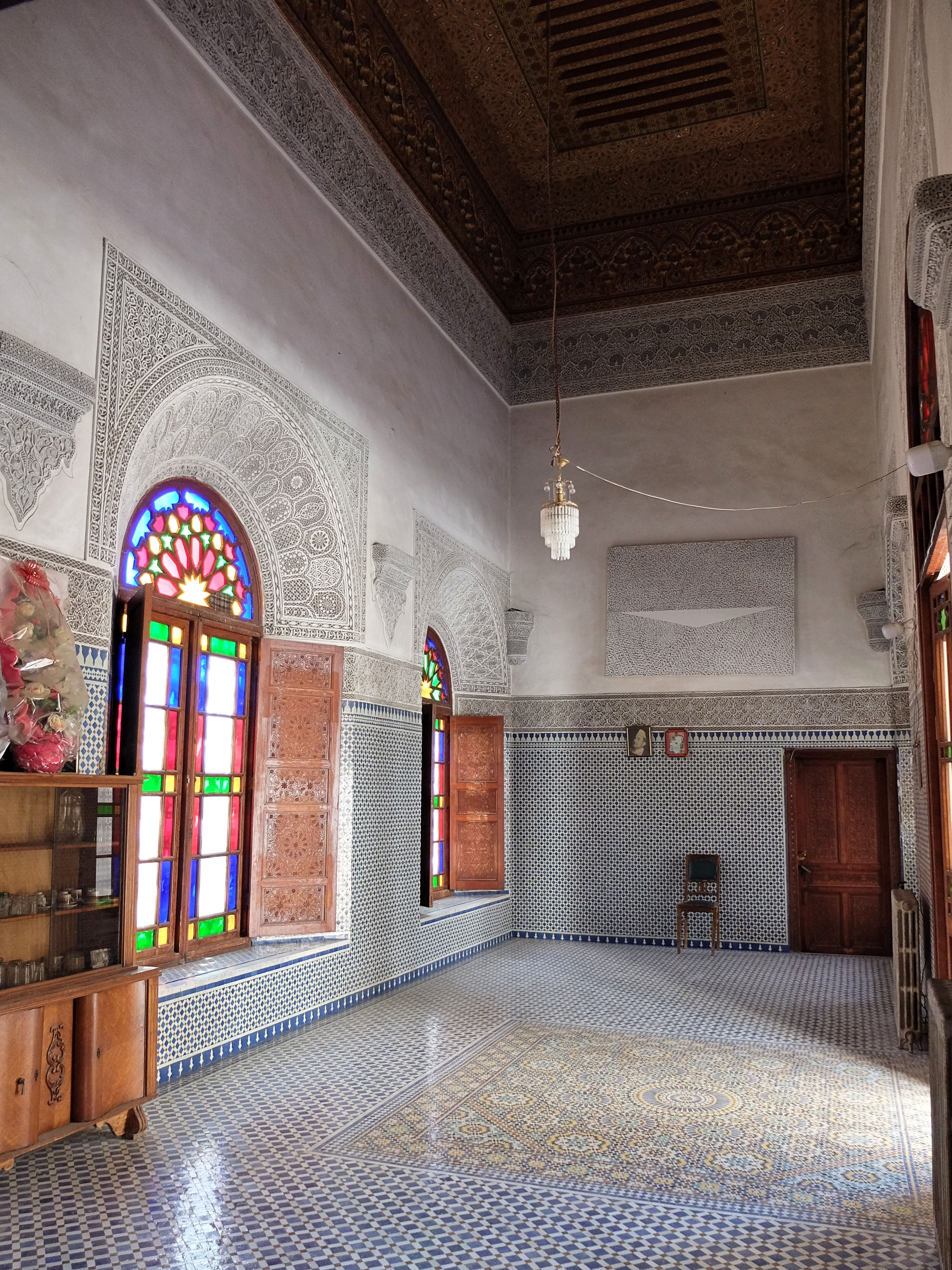
One of the salons accessed from the first courtyard

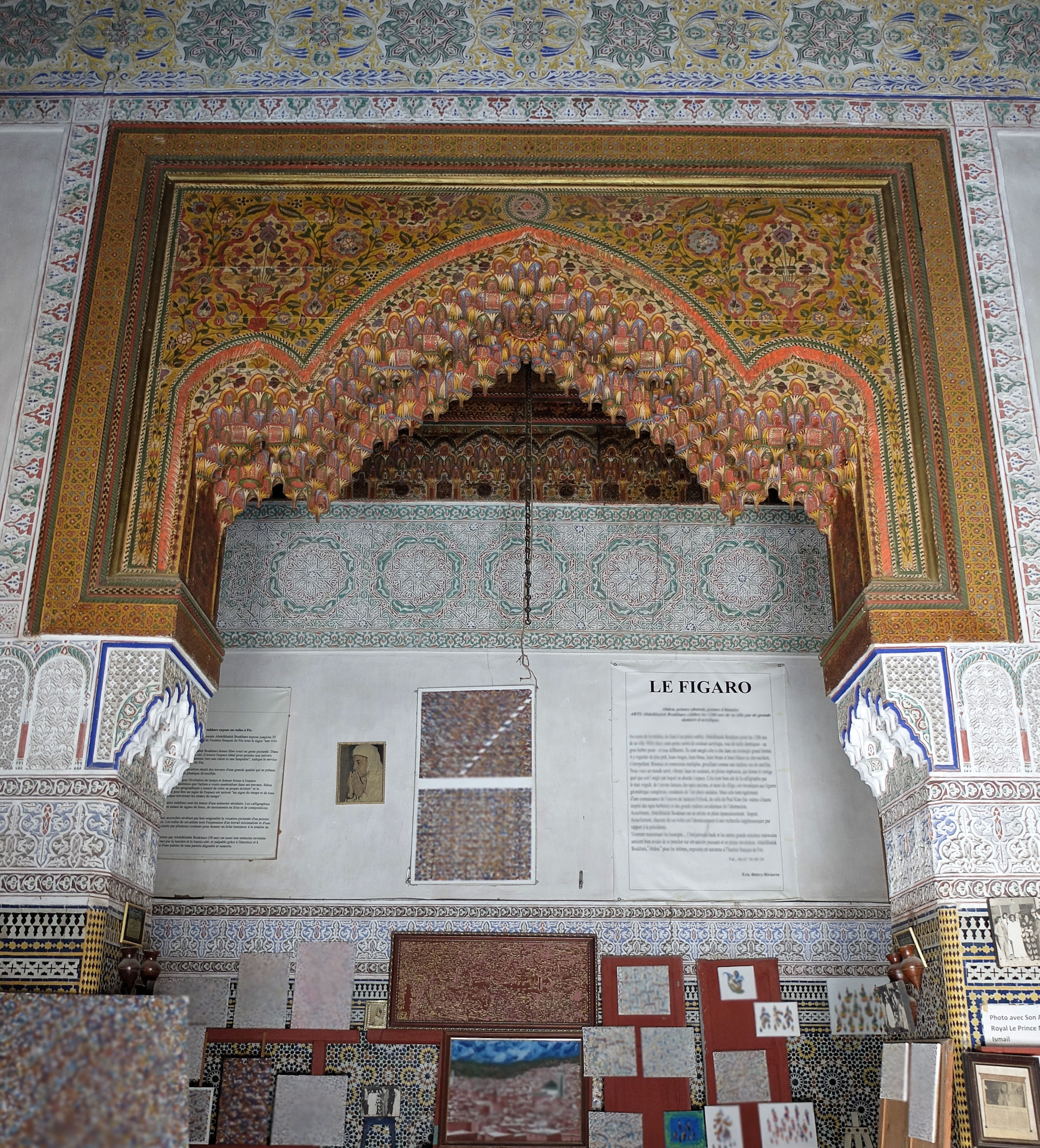
Decoration in one of the salons accessed from the first courtyard

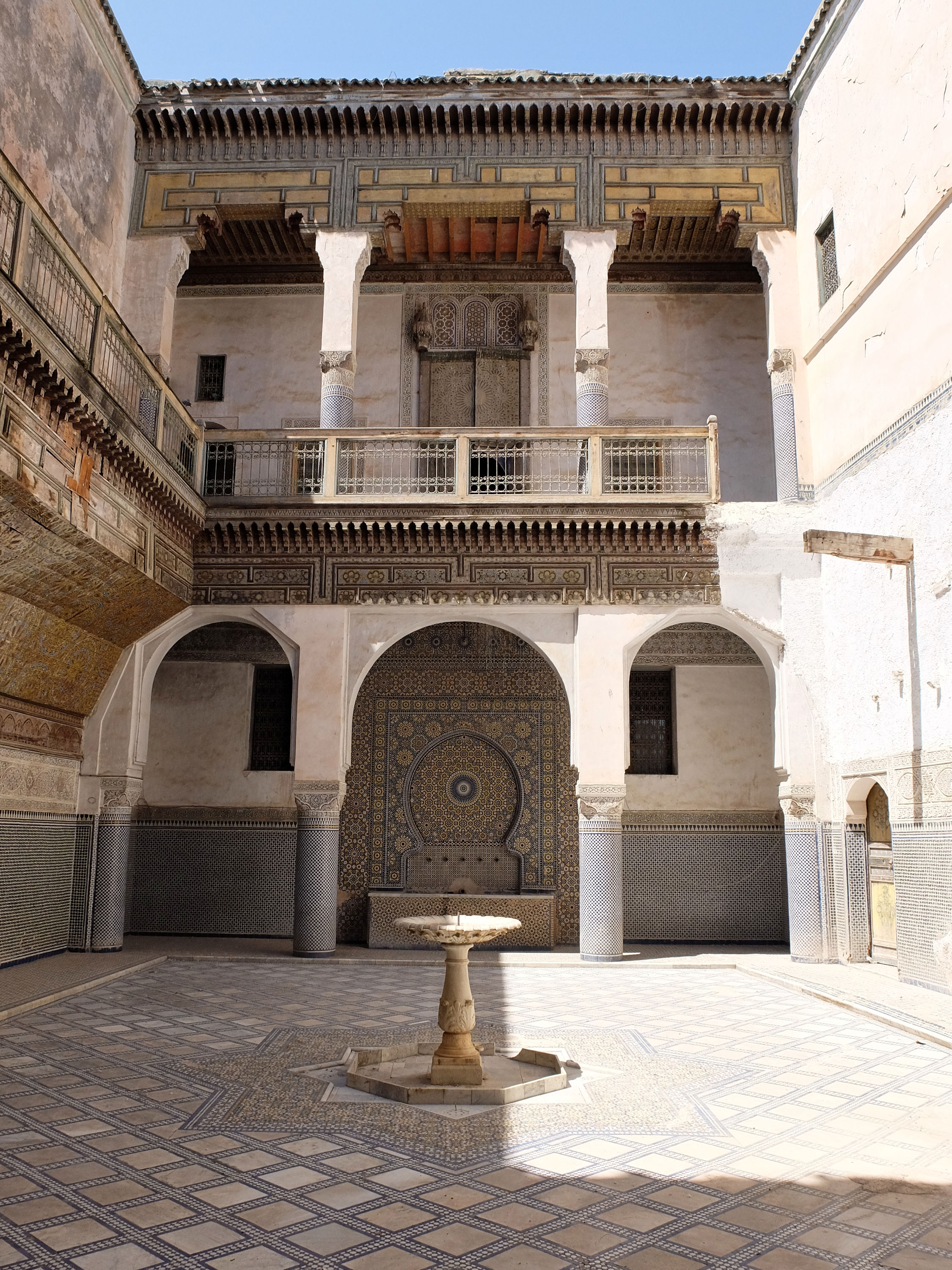
The second or western courtyard of the palace

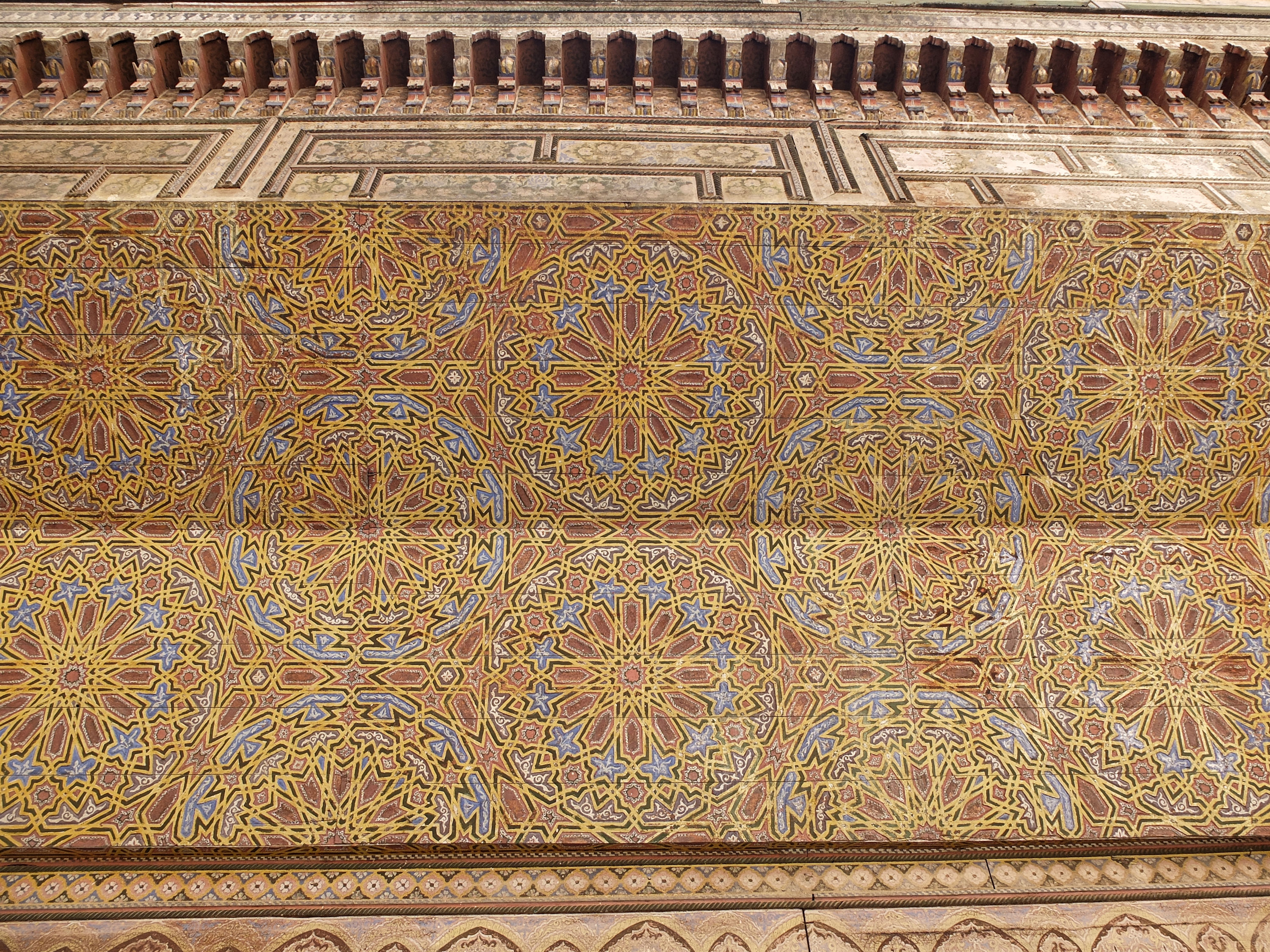
Detail of the painted decoration on the wooden balcony in the second courtyard

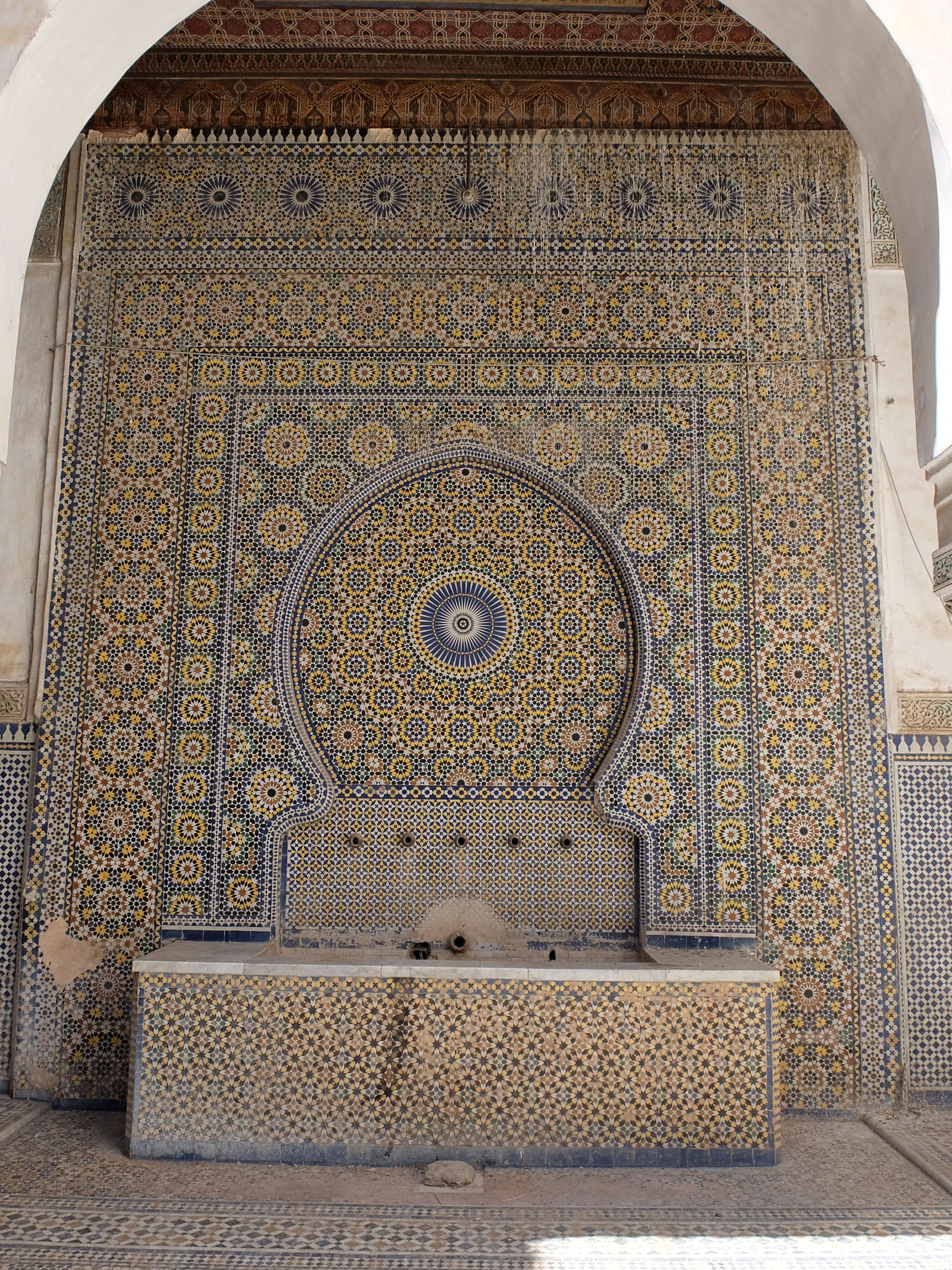
A wall fountain covered in zellij (mosaic tilework) in the second courtyard
