= Telouet Kasbah =

Moroccan cultural heritage site

Coordinates: 31°17′18″N 7°14′28″W

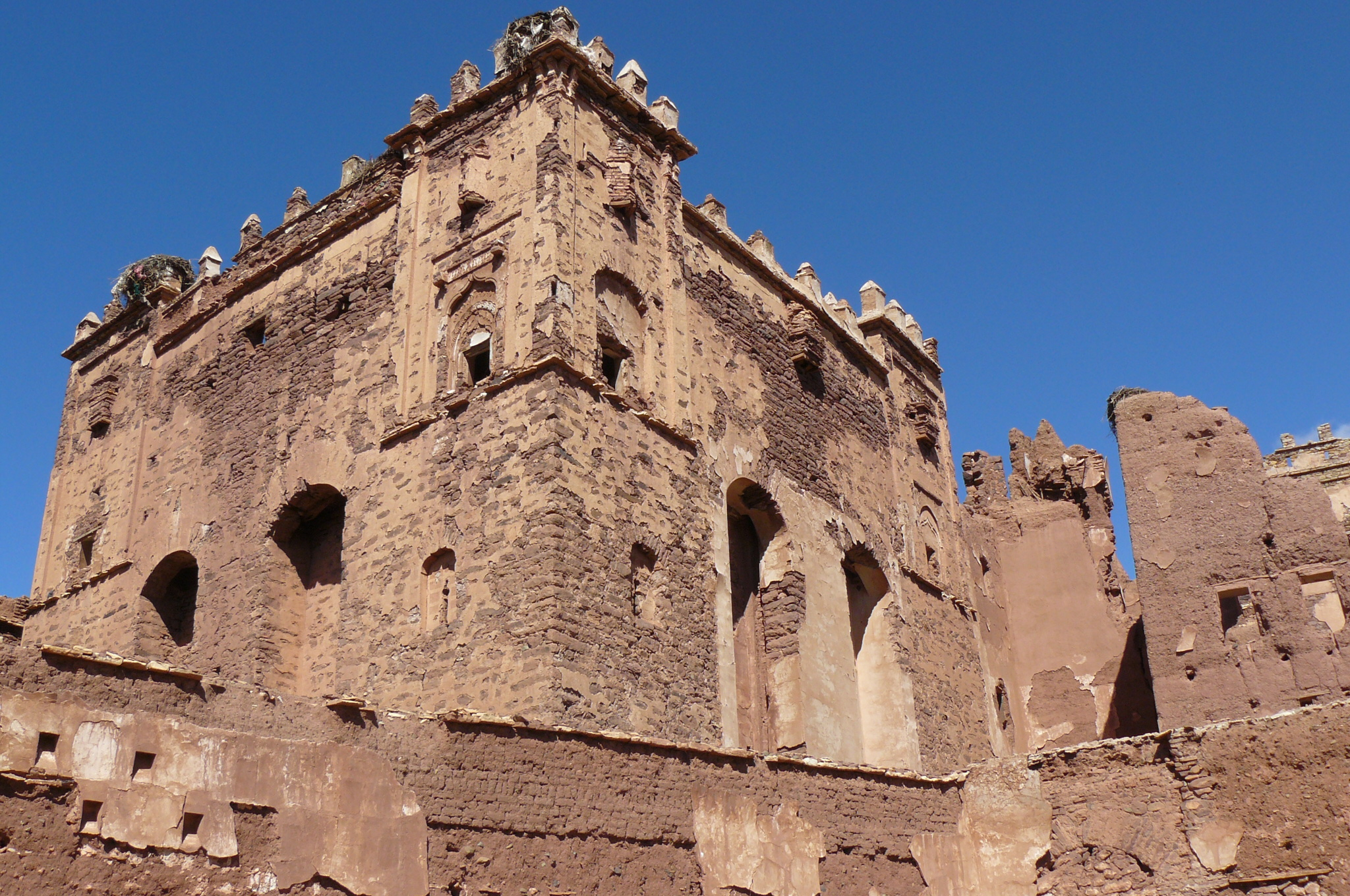
View of the main building of the kasbah

Telouet Kasbah (Berber: ⵉⵖⵔⵎ ⵏ ⵜⵍⵡⴰⵜ; Arabic: قصبة تلوات; French: Casbah de Télouet) is a kasbah in the north of Ouarzazate Province in Morocco. It is located along the former route of the caravans from the Sahara over the Atlas Mountains to Marrakesh. The kasbah was the seat of the El Glaoui family's power, thus sometimes also called the Palace of Glaoui. Its construction started in 1860 and it was further expanded in later years. The palace can still be visited but it is steadily becoming more damaged and is slowly collapsing. In 2010, work was underway to restore the property.

== Location ==
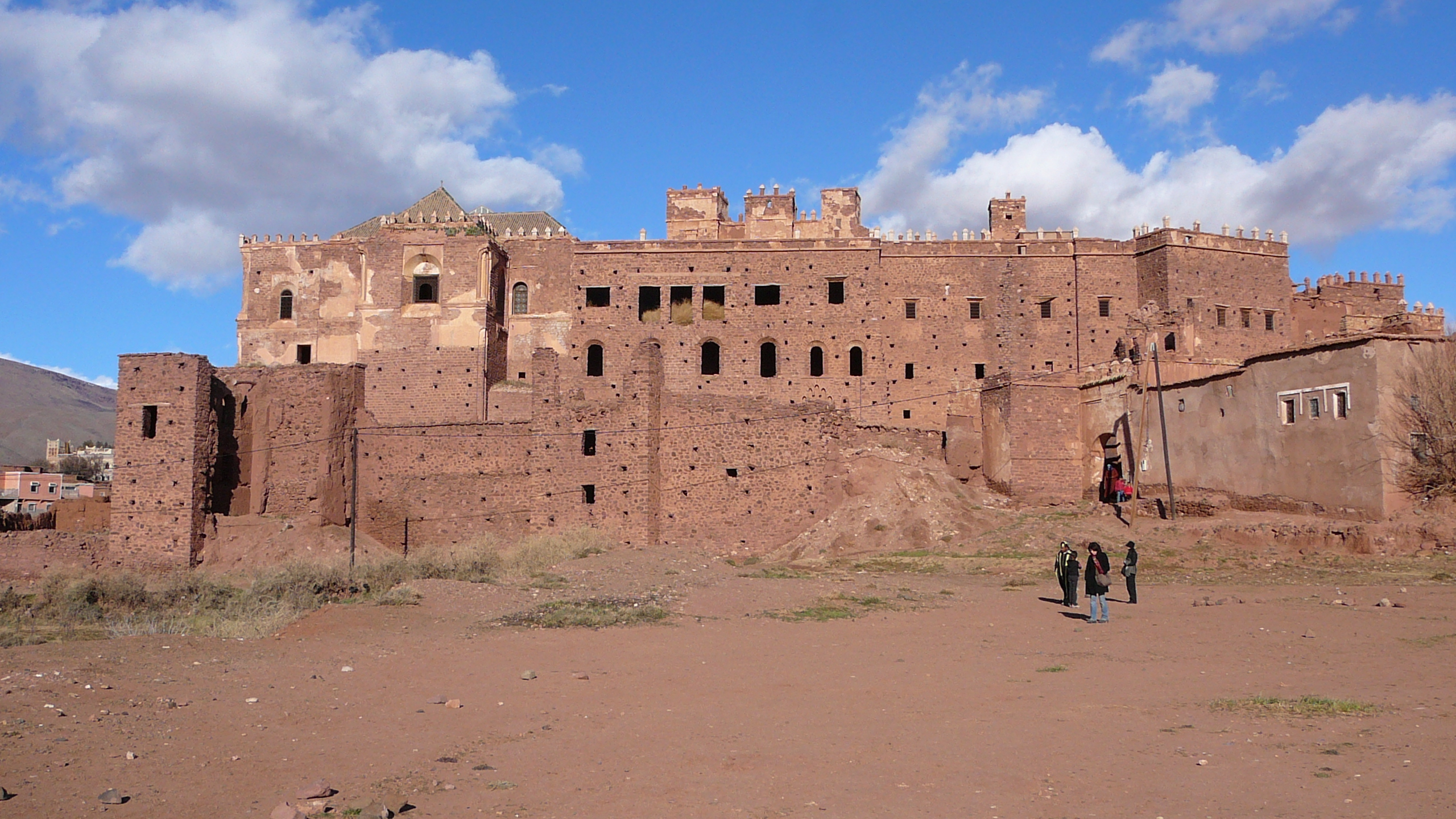
Overview of the complex today (southwest side)

The palace is located on the outskirts of the small Berber village of Télouet, in Morocco. It lies at an elevation of 1,800 metres (5,900 ft). Occupying a strategic position in the High Atlas, the occupants of the palace had the privilege of being on the passage of caravans and near major salt mines.

== History ==
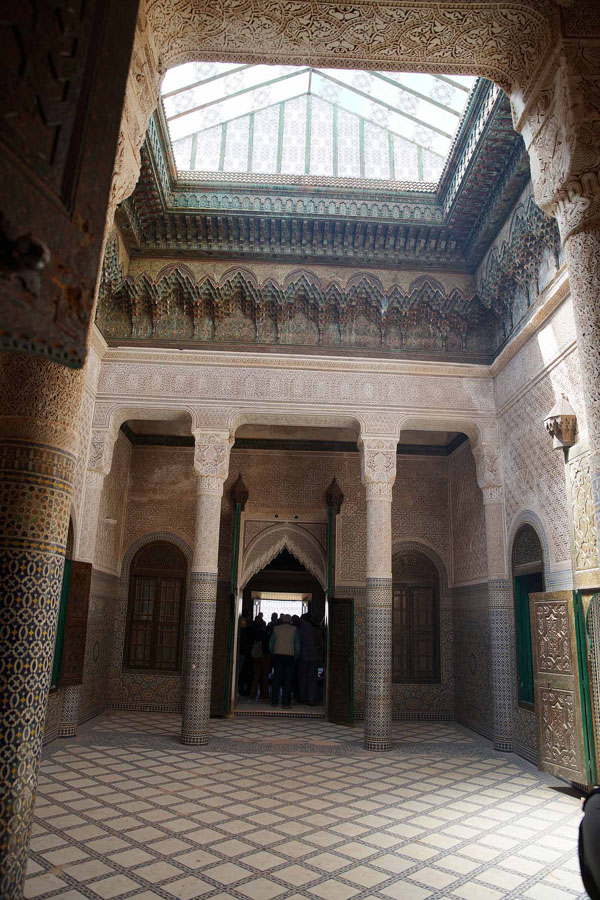
Upper-floor reception room in the restored section of the Kasbah today

The passage of the merchant caravans, which connected the desert with the large cities situated on the other side of the Atlas, and the proximity of the salt mines, made the wealth of the Pashas inhabiting Telouet. The current kasbah was built starting in 1860 by Mohammed Ibiyet, the head of the Glaoui clan in the High Atlas. Construction took 5 years and is said to have involved some 300 craftsmen brought from many parts of Morocco, including Fes. In later years, the kasbah continued to be expanded as the family grew in power and wealth. The craftsmen decorated the walls with zellij and carved stucco and painted the cedar-wood ceilings with colorful motifs, adding distinctive elements of the classical Andalusi-Moroccan style to local Amazigh (Berber) styles.

During the French colonial occupation of Morocco after 1912, the Glaoui family allied itself with the French regime. Thami El Glaoui, the head of the family after Madani El Glaoui's death in 1918, was recognized as "Pasha" of Marrakesh. At the height of his power, he had amassed considerable wealth, making him one of the country's leading figures. His political affiliation with the French and his role in pushing Mohammed V into exile eventually brought about his family's downfall as Morocco's independence movement gained strength. Thami died of cancer in Marrakesh in 1956, just as Mohammed V was returning in triumph to Morocco. His palace in Telouet was still being expanded and decorated when his death and fall from grace put an end to the ongoing work. In 1957, after Morocco formally gained independence from France, the Glaoui family's wealth and palaces across the country were confiscated, along with that of other figures who had collaborated with the French administration.

Since then, the Glaoui palace in Telouet has been abandoned and is now owned by the village council. Most of the palace remains in ruins, but a section of ornate receptions rooms on one of the upper floors has been fully restored and made accessible to tourists. The palace, including its restored portion, suffered damage during the 2023 Marrakesh–Safi earthquake.

== See also ==
- Dar el Bacha
- Dar Glaoui
- Kasbah Taourirt
- Moroccan architecture
