= Dar el Bacha =

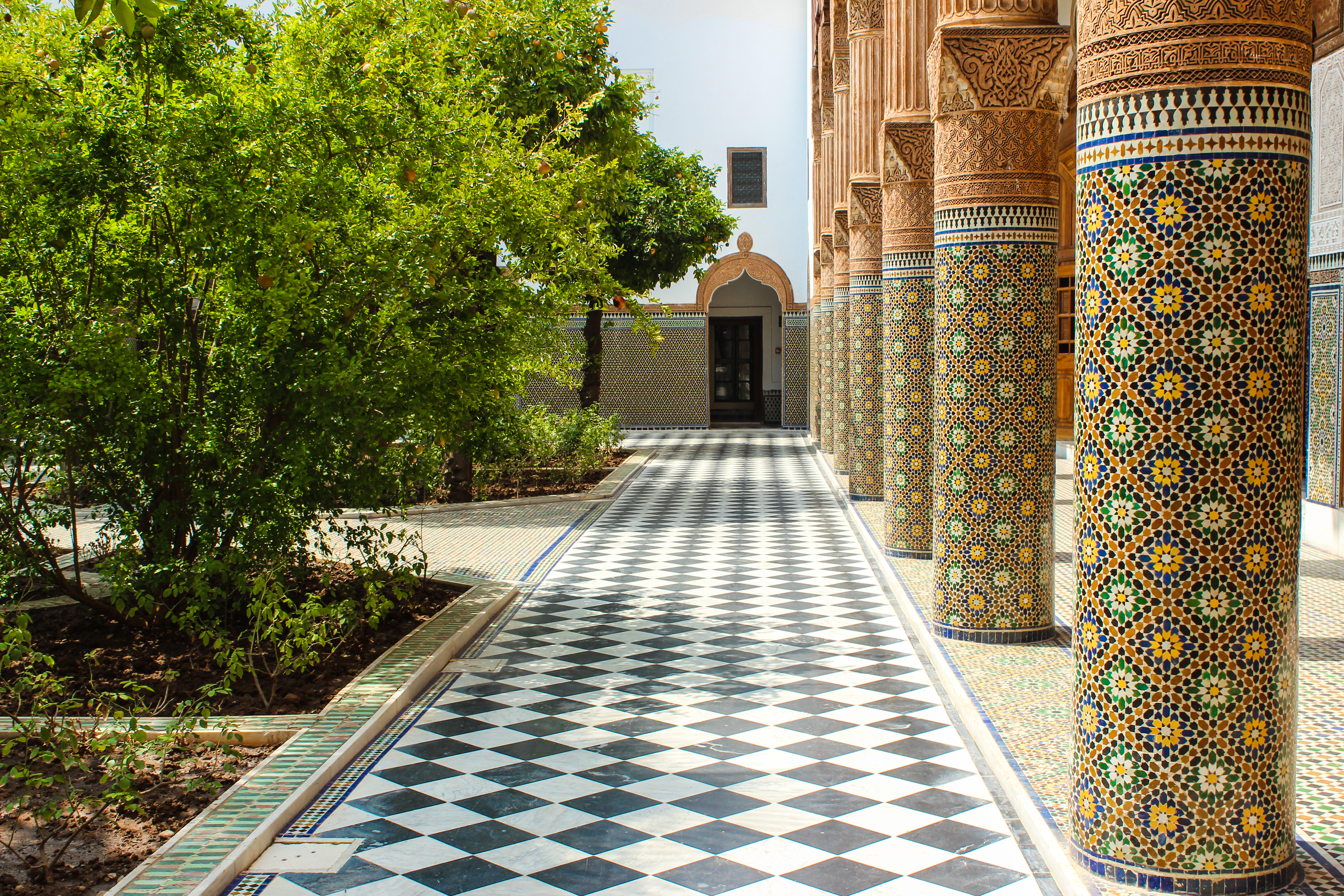
- Courtyard of the palace
- Established: 1910
- Location: Marrakesh, Morocco
- Coordinates: 31.631573°N 7.992403°W
- Type: Art museum
- Collections: Art objects, historical artifacts
- Website: https://fnm.ma/musees-ouverts/musee-des-confluences-dar-el-bacha/

Dar el Bacha (Arabic: دار الباشا, lit. 'House of the Pasha') is a palace situated in the old medina of Marrakesh, Morocco. It currently houses the Museum of Confluences.

== History ==
Built in 1910, the Dar el Bacha, which means "house of the pasha", was the residence of Thami El Glaoui, who was given the title of pasha (roughly "governor" or other high official) of Marrakesh by the Sultan Moulay Youssef in 1912. For years he was the most powerful political figure of the Moroccan south under French rule. He built his private palace on a lavish scale to impress guests.

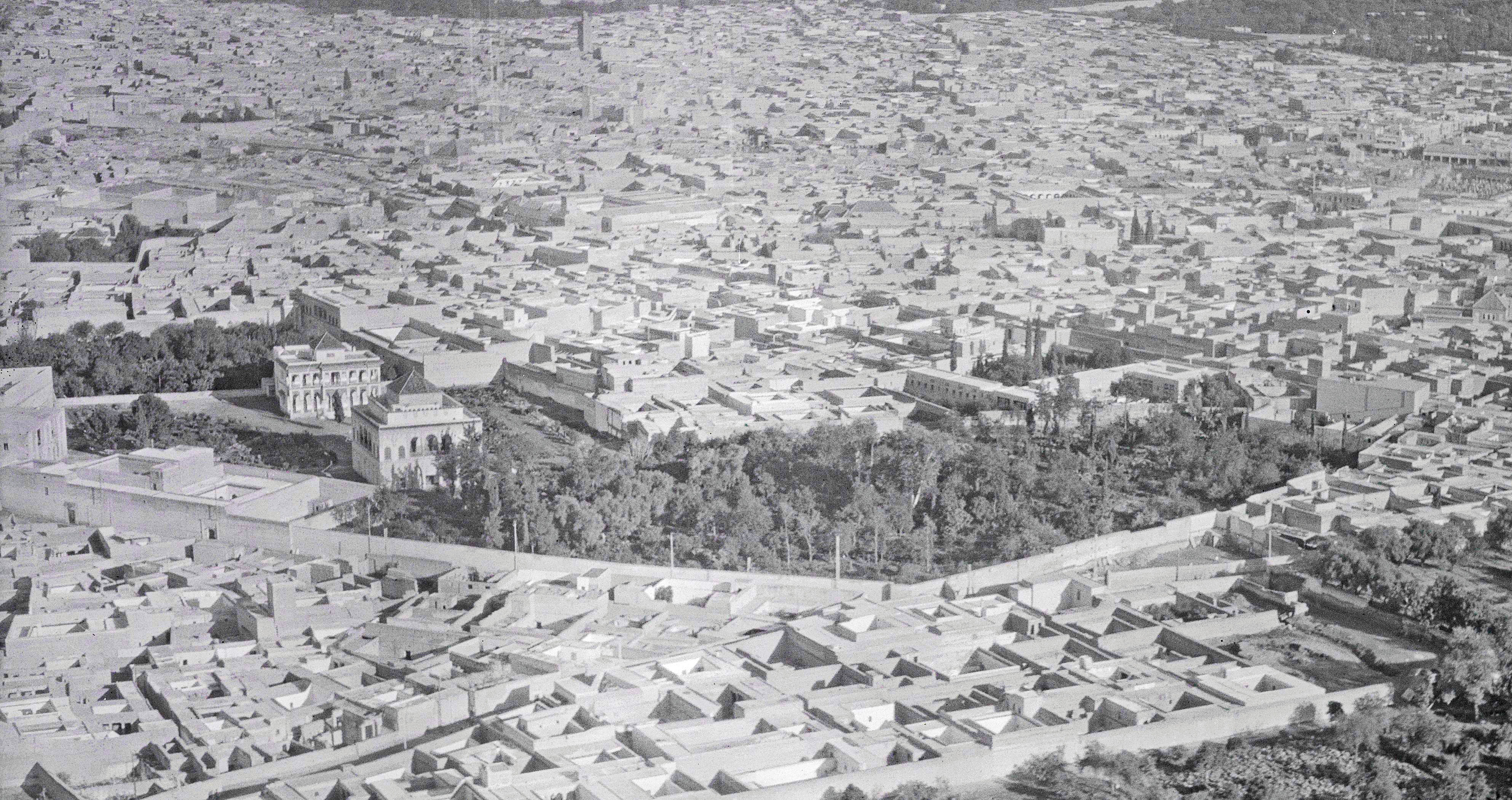
Dar el Bacha grounds in the early 1930s: the main palace structure is off-frame to the left, but the large gardens and its pavilions are visible (mid-frame)

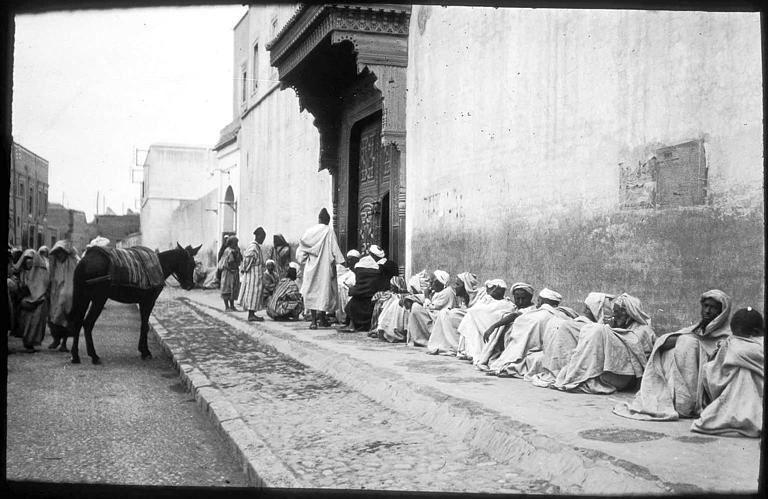
Local men lining up to be received inside Pasha Glaoui's palace, in a 1924 photo (palace gate visible in the middle)

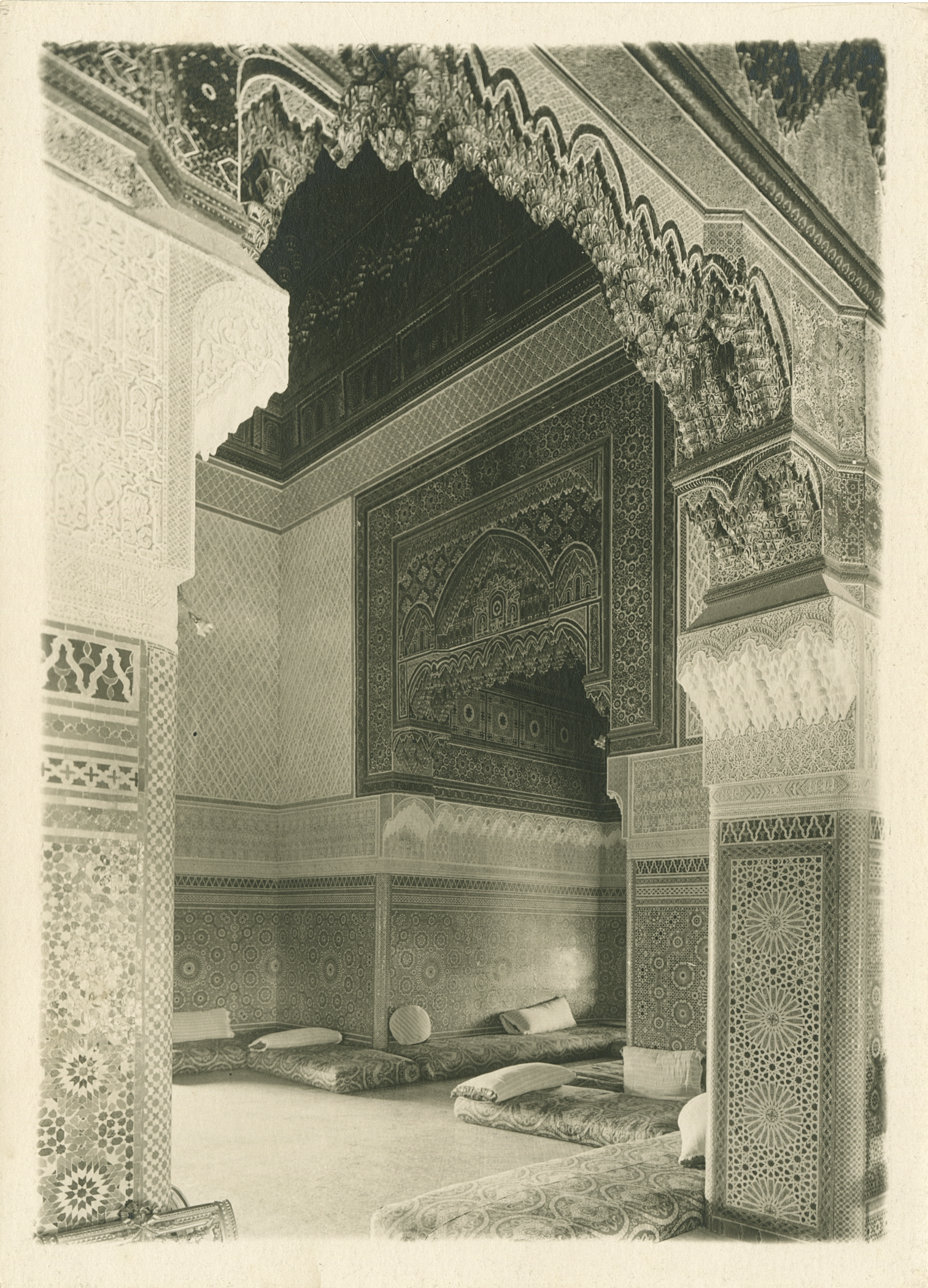
A room inside the palace in 1927

The palace was renovated by the Fondation nationale des musées (FNM) of Morocco and converted into a museum known as the Dar El Bacha – Musée des Confluences or "Museum of Confluences". It was inaugurated by Mohammed VI of Morocco on 9 July 2017.

The palace suffered damage during the September 2023 earthquake and was subsequently closed for repairs. The Fondation nationale des musées has estimated that the palace would reopen in November 2023.

== Architecture ==
Dar el Bacha represents a beautiful example of Moroccan architecture and of riad architecture, with fountains and orange trees in the central courtyard, traditional seating areas, and a hammam. In addition to traditional Moroccan features, the palace also demonstrates influences of European architecture and was one of the earliest palaces in Marrakesh to feature ostentatious decoration on its exterior.

The area where the museum is housed today is centered around a rectangular courtyard occupied by a large riad garden that is symmetrically divided into four parts. On each side of this courtyard is a salon or hall preceded by a portico with ornate columns. The rest of the palace included a hammam, a service area (the douiria), and a private family area (the harem). Many of the original design features have been maintained and restored, including zellij mosaic tilework on the floors and walls, carved stucco decoration, and carved and painted cedar wood doors and ceilings.

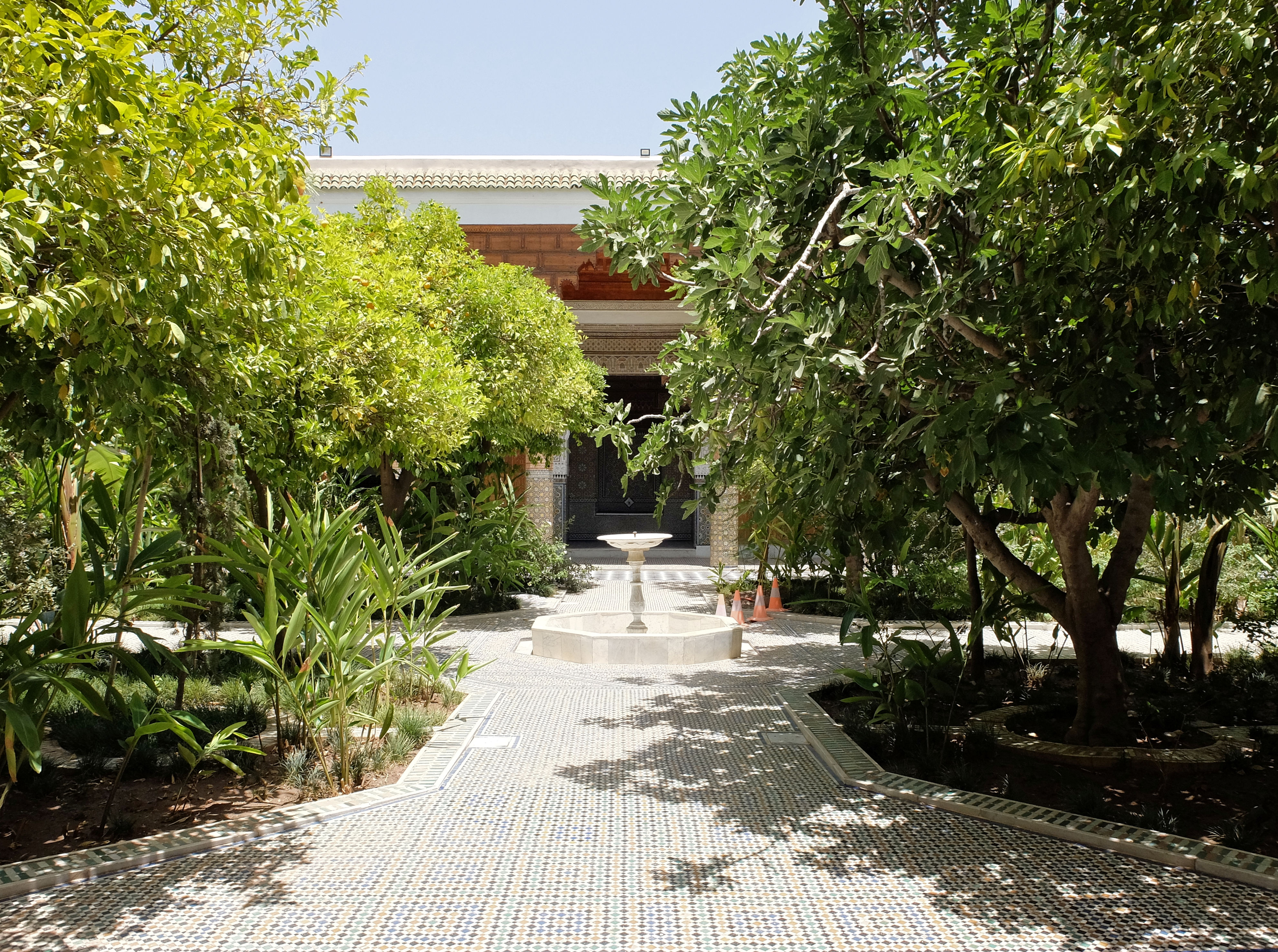
Main courtyard and riad garden of the palace

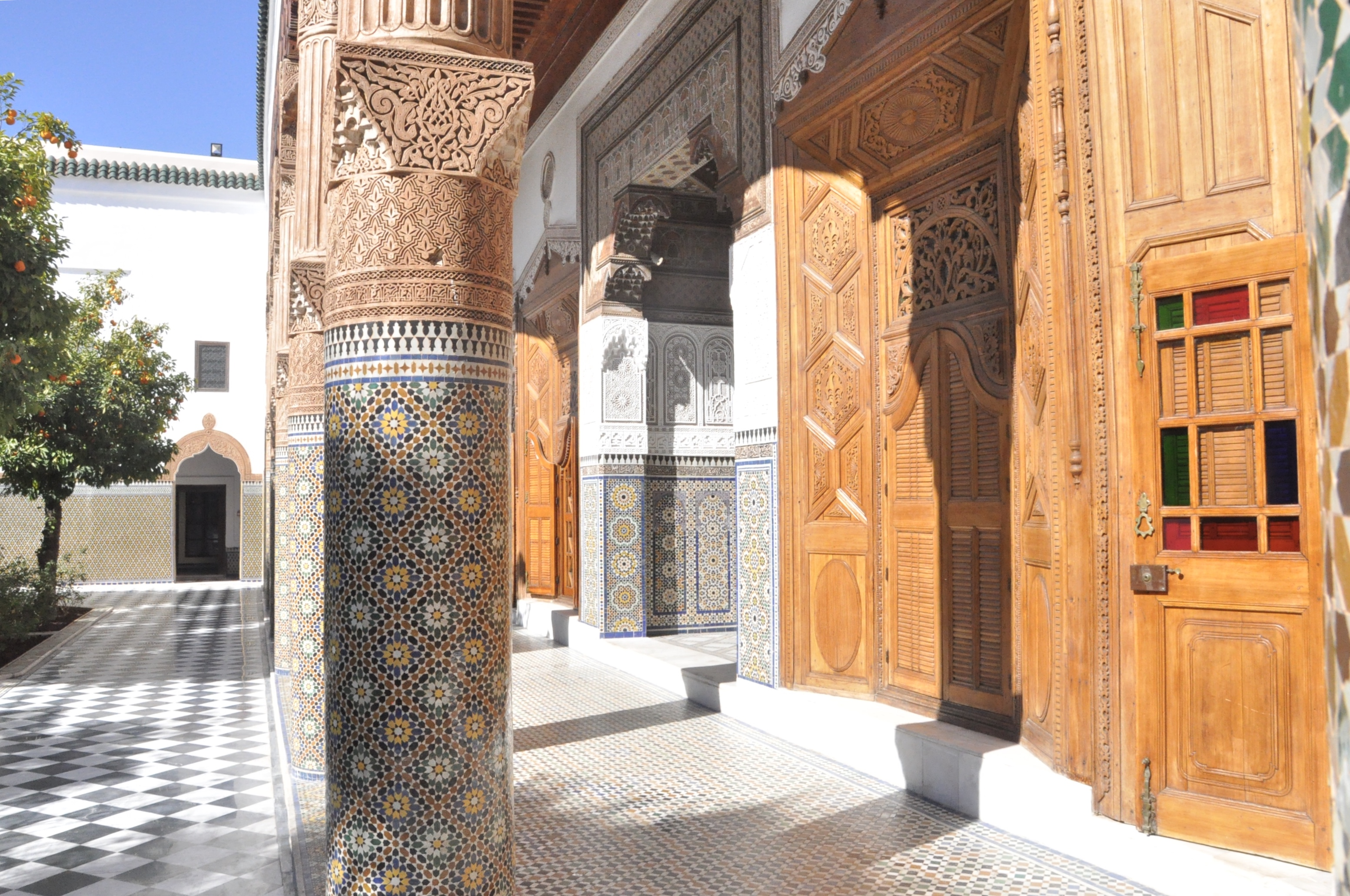
Columns of the courtyard (left) and wooden doors to the salons (right)

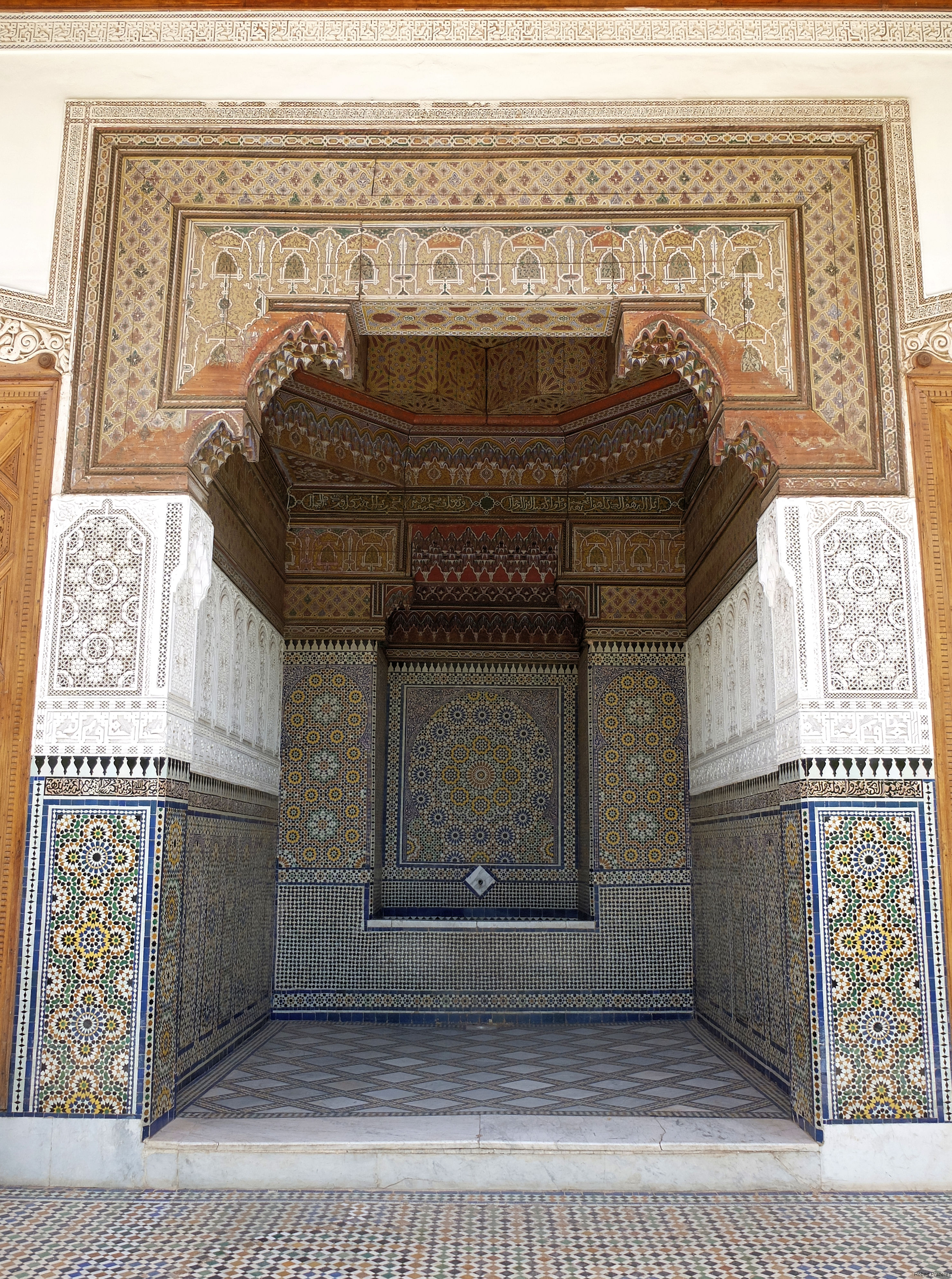
Alcove with wall fountain off the main courtyard

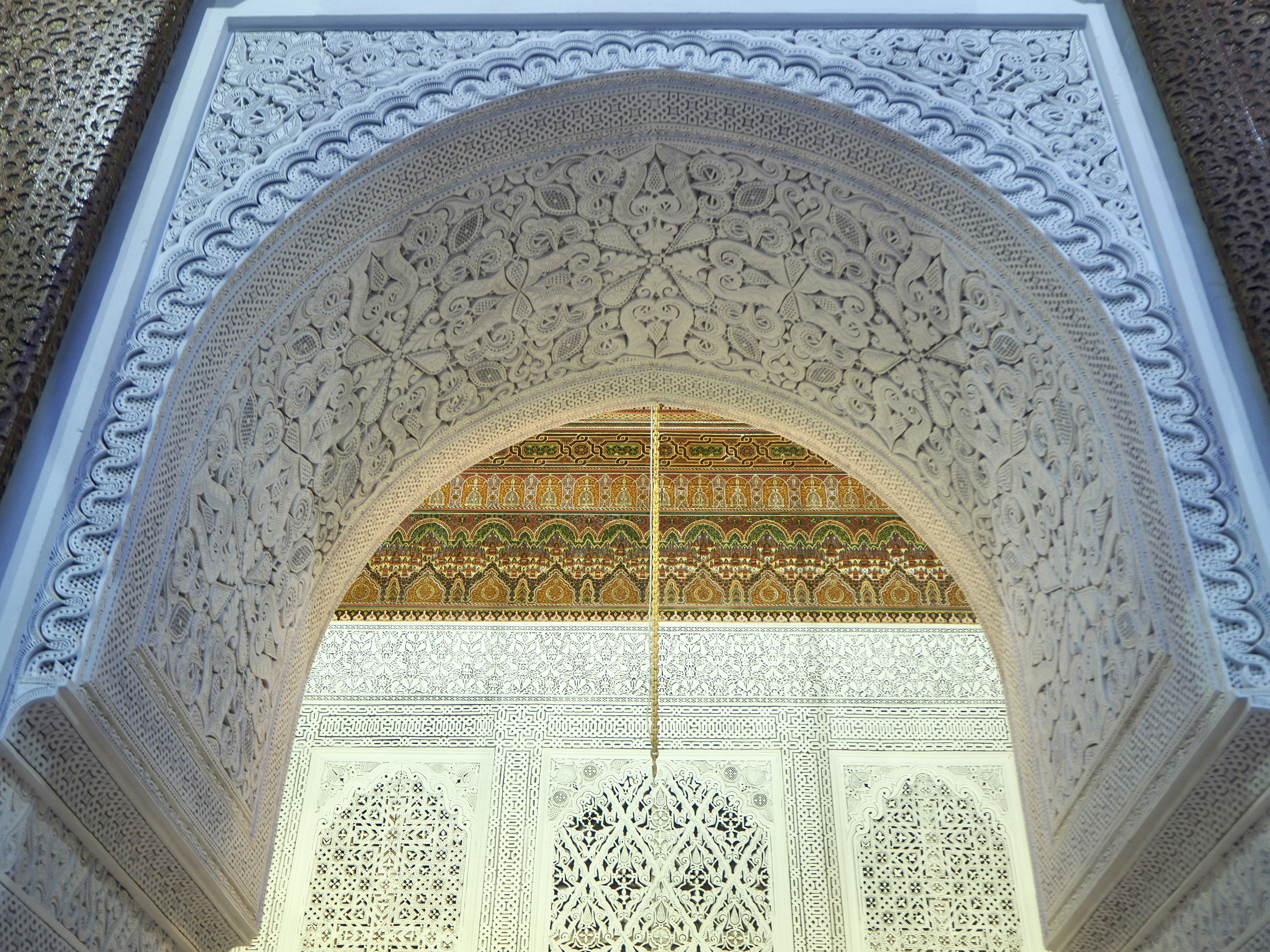
Carved stucco decoration inside the palace

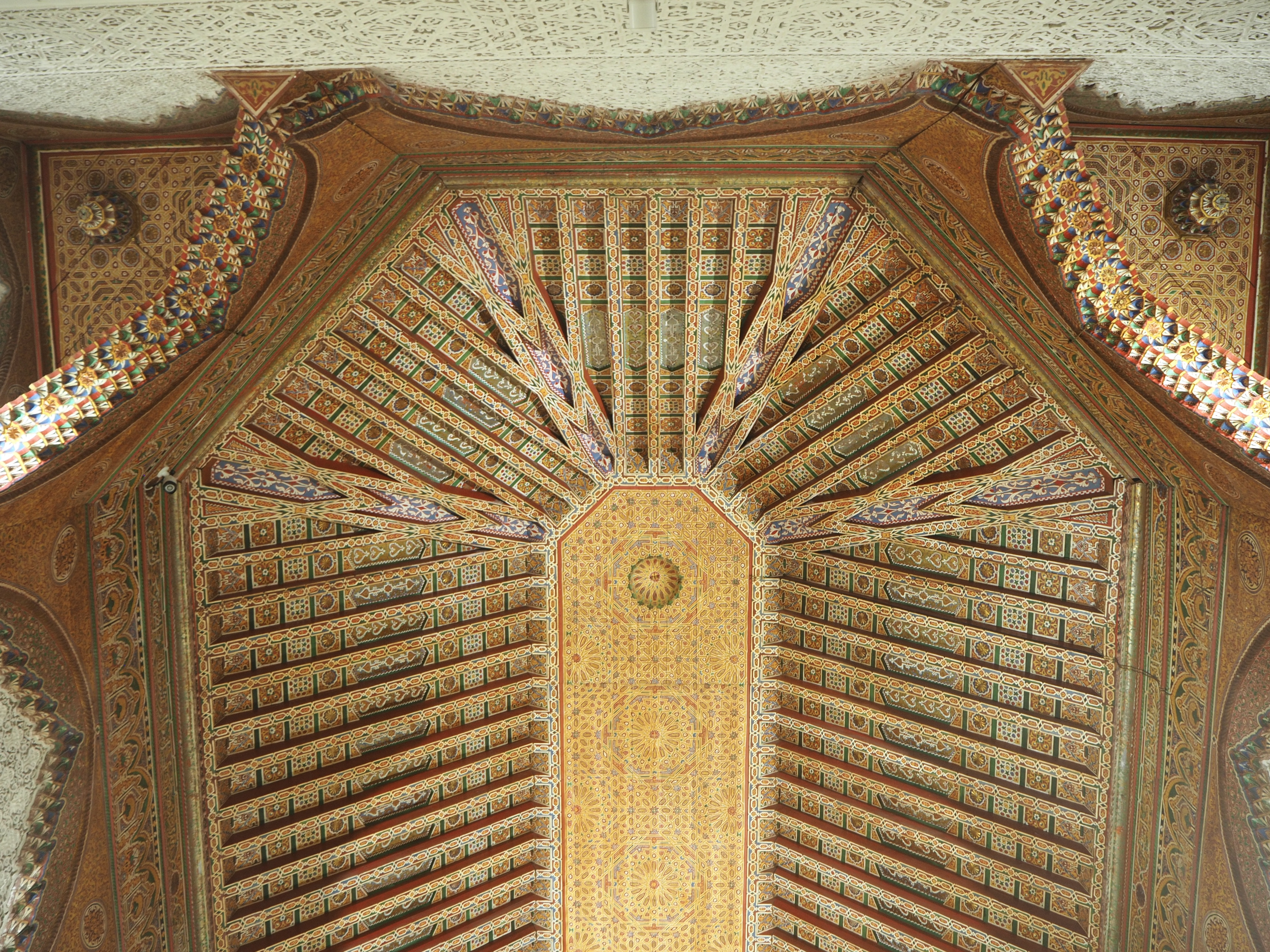
Painted and sculpted wood ceiling over one of the halls

== Museum and café ==
The museum also holds temporary exhibits highlighting the different facets of Moroccan culture, as well as various art objects from different cultures across the world. In 2018, one of its exhibits focused on displaying objects from places of worship in all three monotheistic religions (Judaism, Christianity, and Islam).

The exhibits are located in the rooms around the main courtyard. Also attached to the museum is a café, Bacha Coffee, which is housed in a period salon and specializes in Arabica coffee.

== See also ==
- Dar Glaoui
- Telouet Kasbah
