= Madani El Glaoui =

Moroccan statesman (1860–1918)

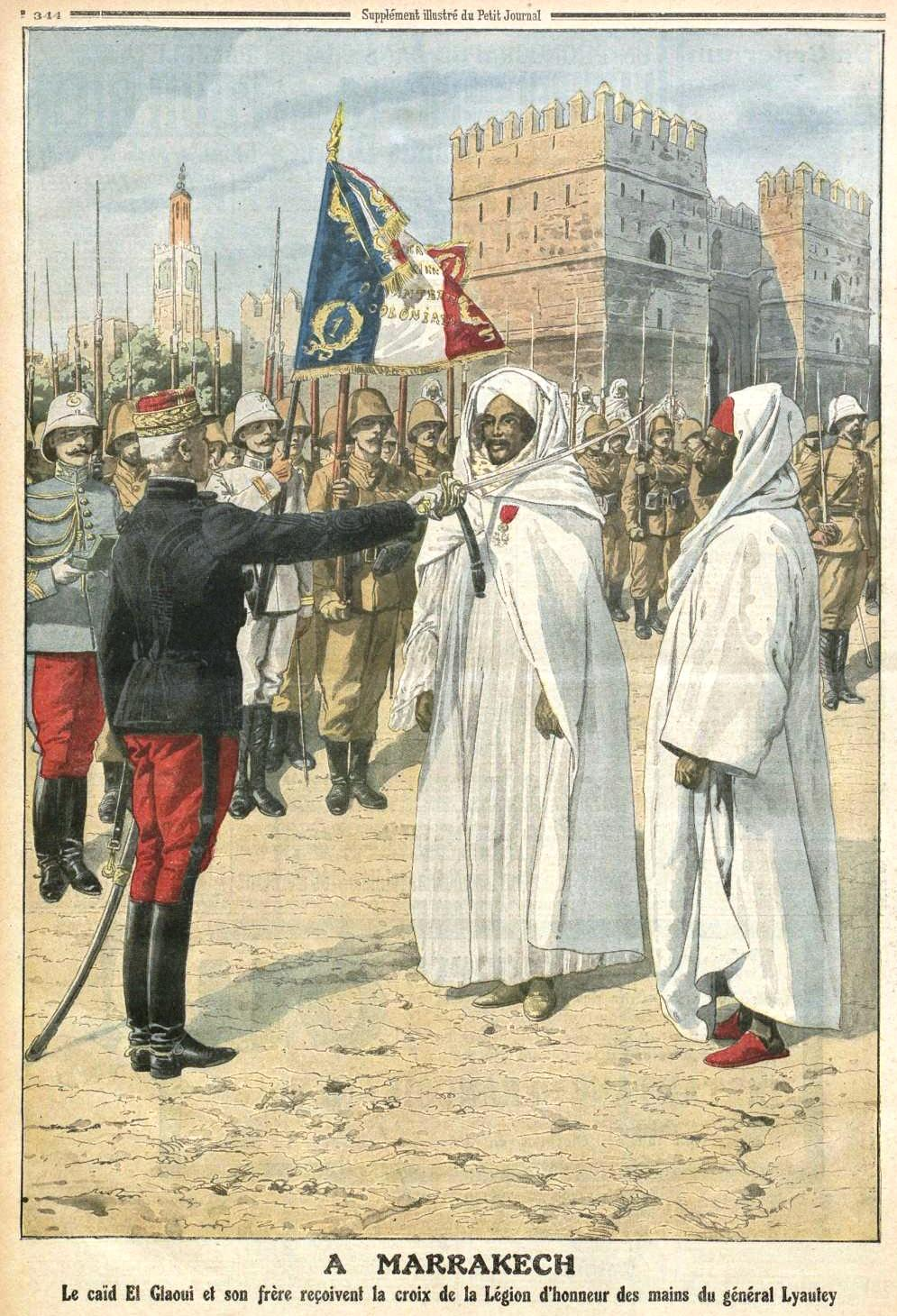
Illustration in a French newspaper in 1912, depicting Madani El Glaoui (centre) and his brother Thami (right) receiving honors from the French general Hubert Lyautey (left)

Si El Madani El Glaoui (1860 – July 1918; born Madani El Mezouari El Glaoui, Arabic: المدني المزواري الڭلاوي, romanized: al-Madanī al-Mazwarī al-Glāwī; Tachelhit: Lmadani Aglawu), nicknamed "the Faqīh" ("the Literate"), was a prominent statesman in Morocco during the late 19th and early 20th centuries. He was largely responsible for establishing the Glaoui family's power in the country.

Descendant of a family in the service of the Moroccan Makhzen since the reign of Moulay Ismail, and invested by Moulay Hassan, Si El Madani served four successive sultans with several functions, culminating in his appointment in 1908 as Grand Vizier (صدر أعظم in Arabic) under Moulay Abdelhafid before being dismissed in 1911 at the urging of France, whose increasing influence in Moroccan affairs he had opposed.

== Life and career ==
The Glaoui family (also transliterated as Glawi) was one of the most powerful political clans in Morocco in the later 19th century and in the first half of the 20th century, having risen to prominent positions of power under Muhammad IV and subsequent sultans.

At the end of the 17th century, one of Madani's ancestors, Ahmed Er-Radi Amezouar, was appointed caïd of the Glaoua during the reign of Moulay Ismail. He was succeeded in 1700 by the caïd Abdessadeq El Glaoui, who received a visit from Moulay Ismaïl in Telouet. This royal visit is mentioned by Thomas Pellow, an English captive who lived in Morocco between 1715 and 1738 and who was in the service of Moulay Ismaïl:

« We were most courteously entertained by Alcayde Abdetsadick Elgolowey, a very good man of the sort, and then a Governor of that part of the country, he being in very high esteem with the Emperor, on account of his keeping his people under very strict order and good decorum. »

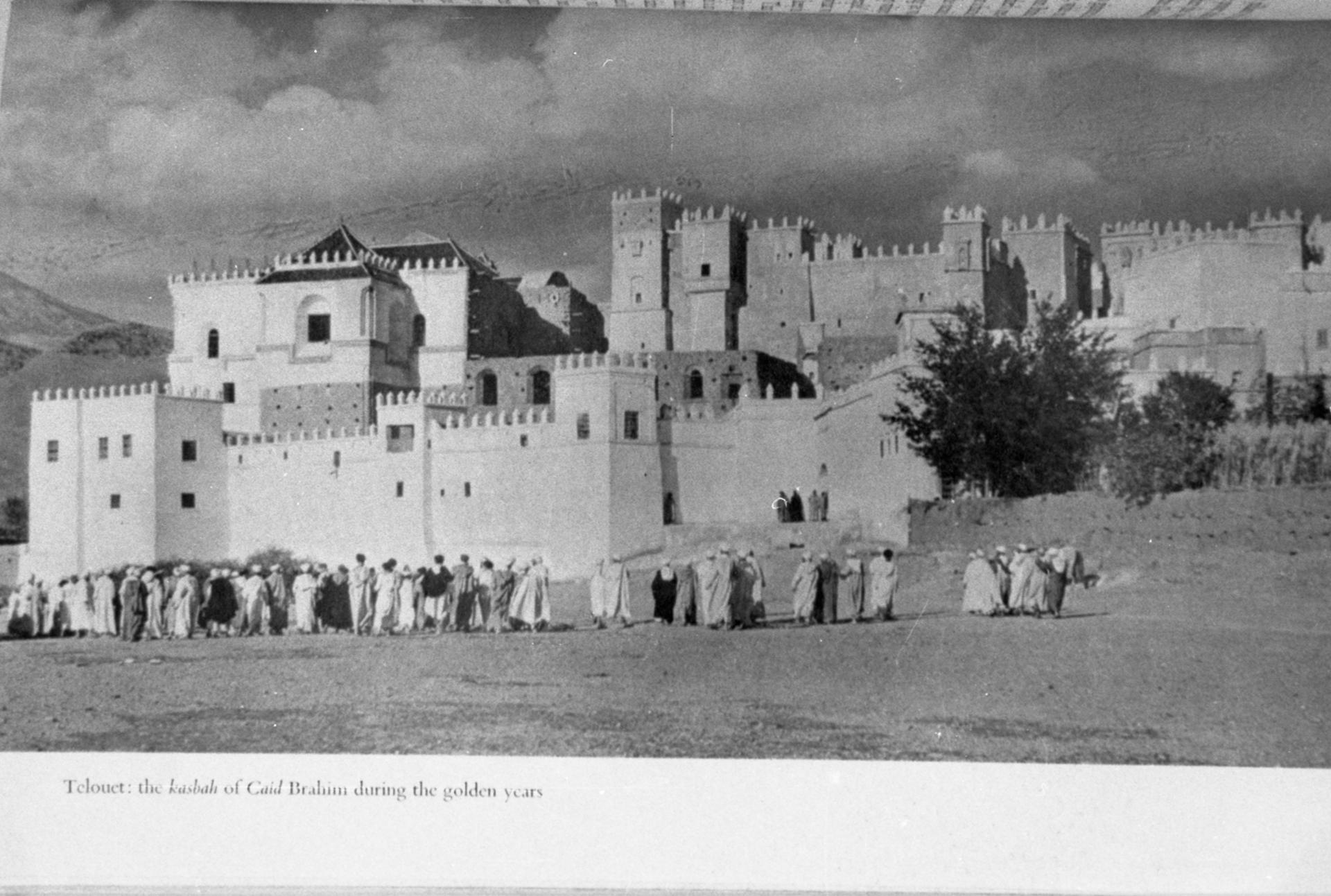
The Kasbah of Telouet

The same family had also constructed a lavish kasbah and fortified residence in Telouet, in the High Atlas, starting in 1860. The family was originally from a place called Tigemmi n'Imezouaren in the territory of the Fatwaka tribe, near the Tassaout River. His father was the qaid of Telouet, Mohammed Ou Hammou, known as Tibibit, and his mother was Zouhra Oum El Khaïr, a black slave. Mohammed Ou Hammou was one of the famous great lords of the south, about whom Eugène Aubin coined the expression "Lords of the Atlas", which was taken up by Jérôme and Jean Tharaud, and later by Gavin Maxwell.

When Si Mohammed died on 4 August 1886, his eldest son Si Mhamed took over his father's position but died the same year. After the death of Si M'hammed, his brother Si Madani took charge of the family clan.

By 1893 the family rivaled in power the other great qa'id families of the south, such as the Goundafi and Mtouggi. Sultan Moulay Hassan's twenty-five-day stopover in Telouet in November 1893, on his return from an expedition in Tafilalt and in the middle of a snowstorm, was a major turning point in Si El Madani's career. The sovereign was aided and supplied in the best possible way by Si El Madani and rewarded him by giving him a nine-inch Krupp gun, shells and a supply of modern rifles, and appointing him khalifa (deputy) over a large region including Todgha, the Draa valley, Tafilalt, and Fayja.

El Madani's duties as caïd led him on several military expeditions through Morocco and among others in the Souss, in the R'hamna in 1896, and against the rogui (i.e. rebel) Tahar Ben Slimane, as well as against the Berabers in 1900. As governor of Tafilalt, a position to which Moulay Abdelaziz appointed him by a dahir of 19 Safar 1318 (18 June 1900), Si El Madani played an important role in maintaining civil peace in this region after the French annexation of the Touat-Tidikelt-Gourara oasis complex.

Between April and December 1903, at the head of a mehalla (military expedition) of 50,000 men, he fought a series of battles against the rogui Bou Hmara and the tribes allied with him between Fez and Oujda and liberated the city of Taza after being wounded three times. However, he was unable to defeat Bou Hmara, which led to him having to pay a fine of 100,000 rials to Moulay Abdelaziz (and which led to the Minister of War at the time, Si El Mehdi El M'nebhi, being exiled to Tangier).

=== The Hafidiya and Madani's apex ===
El Madani was a key player in the Hafidiya, a movement led by Moulay Hafid, then viceroy in Marrakech under his brother, Sultan Moulay Abdelaziz, which deposed the latter. The Hafidiya was a large-scale movement driven by a popular fervour that Abdallah Laroui considered to be "the first expression of a modern Moroccan nationalism". Its main objectives were to liberate the country from the French occupations of Oujda and Chaouia, to abolish the Treaty of Algeciras and its system of protections, to annul the maqs (tax and gate duties) and, in general, to defend the Islamic religion.

During the conflict, Madani initially aided Abdelaziz. After he accompanied the sultan on a military expedition that ended in failure, he then began to doubt Abdelaziz's political abilities and decided to switch sides, supporting Abd al-Hafid instead. As soon as he took power in August 1907, Moulay Hafid appointed Madani to the post of allaf al kebir (i.e. Minister of War) and married his daughter, Lalla Rabia, with whom he had three children. In May 1908, once Fez had been conquered by the new regime, Si El Madani was promoted to the post of Grand Vizier, a position in which he demonstrated a desire for reform. He then secured various offices for his four younger brothers, including having Thami be appointed Pasha of Marrakesh.

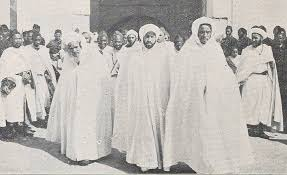
From right to left, Grand Vizier Si El Madani El Glaoui, Si Tayeb El Mokri, Minister of Finance, and Si Abdelmalek El Mtougui, Foreign Minister

El Madani's awareness of the need to undertake institutional and fiscal reform stemmed from knowledge of the upheavals brought about by technical progress in Algeria, which he had visited, and through his contacts with the French military mission, whose technical and operational superiority he had been able to observe.

« Et Sid el-Madani me raconte qu'il a commandé pendant quelques mois les contingents envoyés contre le Rogui. Il est passé par Oran, où il a séjourné assez longtemps pour connaître les Français, pour admirer leurs soldats, leur armement. »

His desire for reform was met with frontal opposition from the majority of the ulema and, according to historian Edmund Burke III, destined to fail given the absence of a modernist social group similar to the Young Turks. Various contemporary testimonies describe his curiosity about world affairs and modernity:

« Already he was interested in the world outside his mountains fastness and was a subscriber to the Arabic press of the Arab East. »

« Au moment des combats sous Verdun il me demandait des détails précis sur la topographie de la région meusienne pour pouvoir mieux suivre les détails de la bataille. »

« Si el Madani caïd de Glaoui, est un homme jeune d'une trentaine d'années, actif autant que peut l'être un Marocain haut placé, très au courant de ce qui se passe dans le monde (derniers incidents de la frontière franco-marocaine; phases successives de la guerre russo-japonaise etc). C'est un homme à idées larges. »

=== Opposition to France and fall from grace ===
Si El Madani opposed the growing ascendancy of the French, who were extending their influence through their military mission. Aware of the danger of depending solely on French military assistance, the Sultan and Si El Madani tried to contain the latter by resorting to Turkish expertise to reorganize Morocco's regular army. Thus, in November 1909, a Turkish captain and 10 non-commissioned officers arrived in Morocco, to the great displeasure of the French, who demanded their immediate dismissal. Several authors have reported on Si El Madani's opposition to the French and their hostility towards him. For example, Frédéric Weisgerber stated the following:

« Le seul membre du makhzen avec lequel nous entretenions des rapports confiants et même cordiaux était Si Aïssa Ben Omar, vizir des relations extérieures. Devenu suspect de ce fait, détesté du grand-vizir El Glaoui, il fut révoqué et interdiction lui fit faite de quitter la capitale. »

Madani's conflict with France as well as the revolt of the tribes of Fez (during which he was almost killed in battle on 26 April 1911) precipitated his dismissal by Moulay Hafid on 26 May 1911 at the urging of General Moinier, head of the French military mission in Morocco and Gaillard, consul of France in Morocco. A dispatch from Gaillard to De Billy, chargé d'affaires of the French Republic in Tangier, dated 26 May 1911, describes his dismissal as follows:

« Le Sultan a décidé la révocation du Grand Vizir. Aujourd'hui, il lui a fait dire de ne plus se rendre au Makhzen jusqu'à nouvel ordre. […] J’ai aussitôt avisé le Général Moinier. Il a été très satisfait de cette mesure qui facilitera grandement l'œuvre de pacification. »

Ladret de Lacharrière adds:

« Le résultat le plus marquant pour les Marocains de l'arrivée des Français à Fez a été la disgrâce du grand vizir Si Madani el Glaoui. »

Burke also describes the dismissal as being directed by the French:

«One of the first steps taken by the French after their arrival was the summary firing of Madani al-Glawi and all members of his clan holding makhzan office.»

As the French began to intervene directly in Morocco in the following years, they soon changed their minds upon realizing that the Glaoui clan could be instrumental in controlling the region. The family thus developed friendly relations with the French. Madani died in 1918.

At the time of his death, Si El Madani had under his authority a region extending from Marrakesh, on both sides of the Atlas Mountains, and encompassing the regions of Mesfioua, Demnate, Ouarzazate, Skoura, Dades and Todgha towards Tafilalt, Wadi Draa, Zenaga, Souktana and Aït Ouaouzgit. His brother Thami ultimately kept his position as Pasha of Marrakesh under French Protectorate rule until 1956, during which time he acted as the strongman of southern Morocco.

== Legacy ==
Madani El Glaoui played a significant role in the history of Morocco at the end of the 19th century and the beginning of the 20th century in a context of colonial penetration. As Paul Pascon asserted, he was "the founder of the power of the Glaouis". Other authors, such as Robert Montagne, Walter B. Harris, Henri Terrasse and Gavin Maxwell, have recognized the pre-eminence of Si El Madani over all the other members of the family and in particular over his younger brother the pasha Thami El Glaoui. Abdessadeq El Glaoui, Thami's son, also attests to this primacy.
