= Georges Hilbert =

French sculptor (1900–1982)

- Born: 22 March 1900; Nemours, French Algeria
- Died: 8 September 1982 (aged 82); Saint-Martin-d'Abbat, Loiret, France
- Occupation: Sculptor

Georges Hilbert (1900–1982) was a French sculptor. He became a member of the Académie des Beaux-Arts in 1973.
