= Dar Si Said =

Historic mansion and museum in Marrakesh, Morocco

Coordinates: 31°37′24″N 7°59′1.7″W

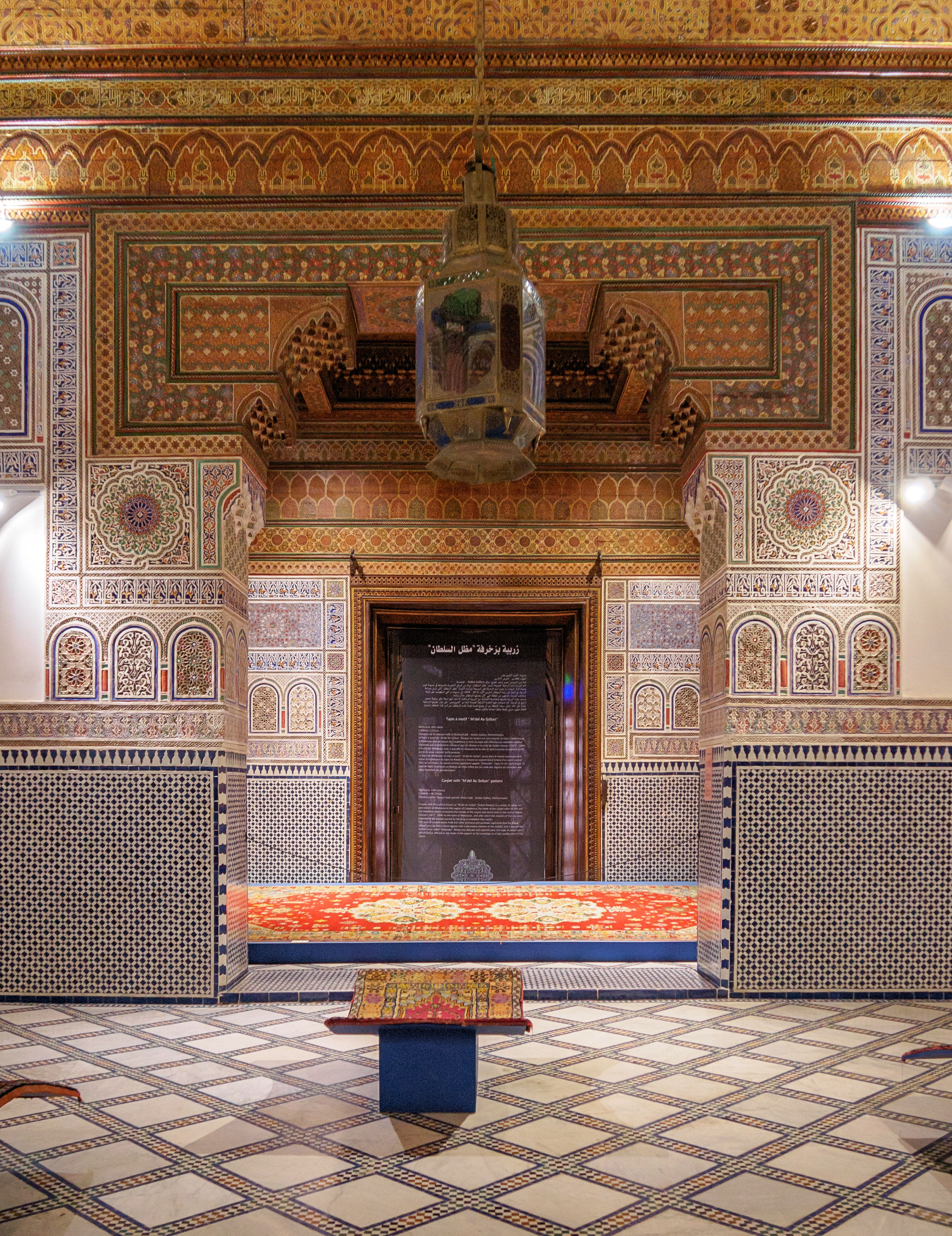
Rooms and decorated doorways inside the palace

Dar Si Said (Arabic: دار السي سعيد) is a historic late 19th-century palace and present-day museum in Marrakesh, Morocco. It currently houses the National Museum of Weaving and Carpets.

== History ==
It was built between 1894 and 1900 by Si Sa'id ibn Musa, a vizier and minister of defence under his brother Ba Ahmad ibn Musa, who was the Grand Vizier and effective ruler of Morocco during the same period under Sultan Abdelaziz (ruled 1894–1908). After 1914, under the French Protectorate administration, the palace served as the seat of the regional leaders of Marrakesh. It was converted into a museum of "indigenous arts" (meaning Moroccan art) and woodcraft in 1930 or 1932. In 1957, after Moroccan independence, the palace was split into a museum section and a section occupied by the Service de l’Artisanat (Agency of Artisanship).

The building has been restored several times since and remains a museum today. Following renovations carried out by the recently created Fondation Nationale des Musées, the museum reopened in 2018 as the National Museum of Weaving and Carpets.

The museum was significantly damaged by the September 2023 earthquake and was subsequently closed for repairs. As of October 2023, it was estimated that repairs would take at least six months.

== Architecture ==
The palace's architecture is similar in ornament to the Bahia Palace built further south by his father and his brother, but unlike the latter it is built over more than one level and has a very different layout. Its architectural highlights include a grand reception hall on the upper floor and a large riad garden with a central pavilion of painted wood.

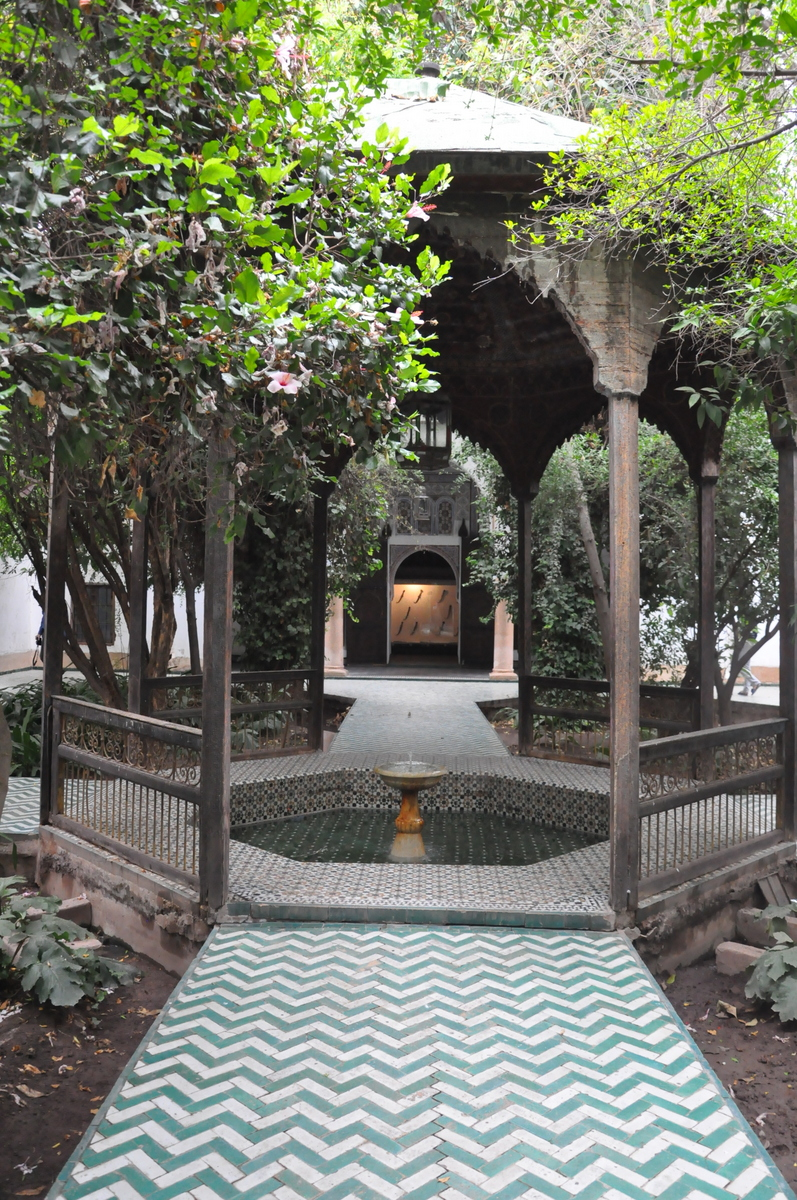
The riad garden

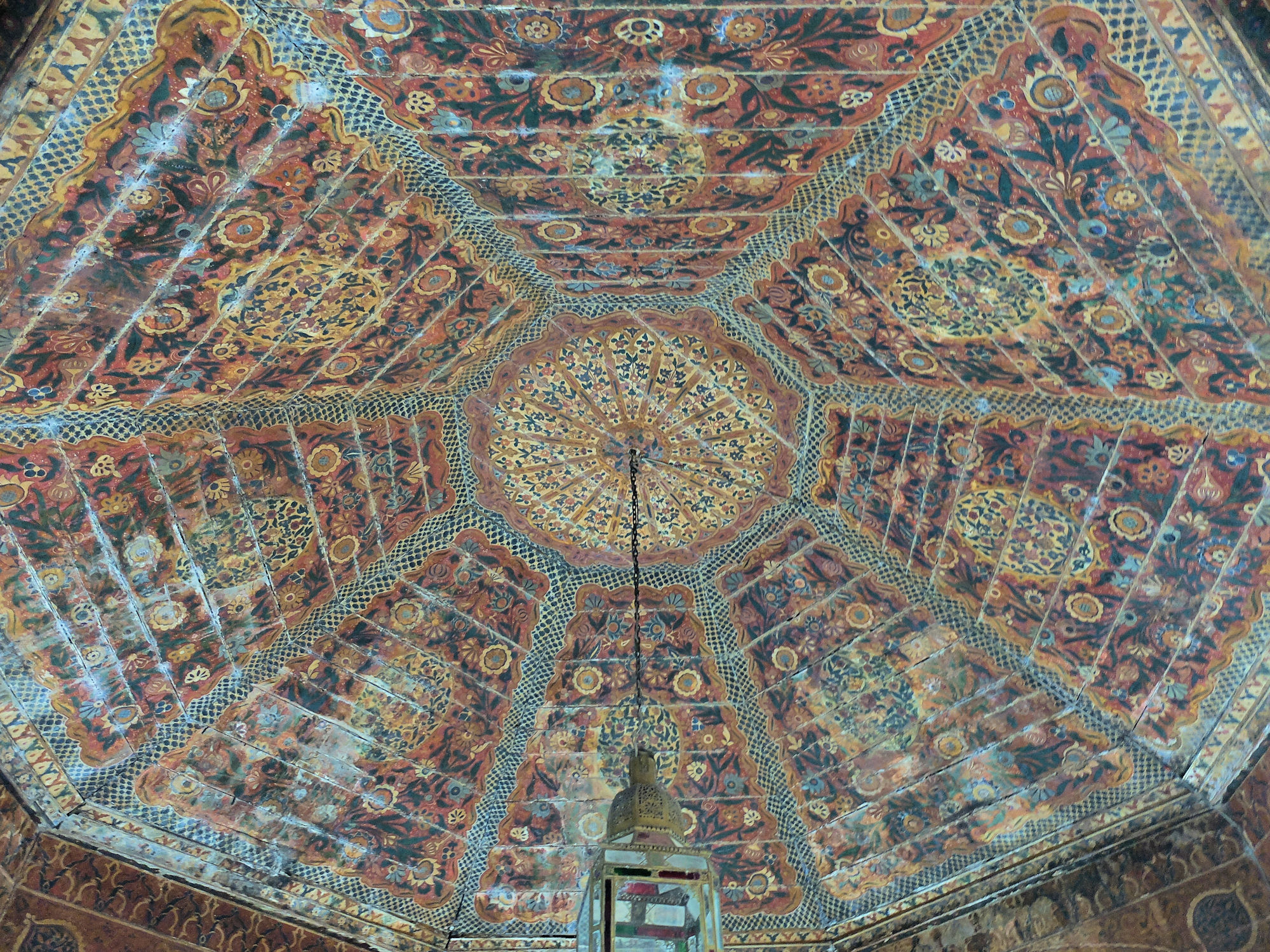
Painted decoration inside the wooden pavilion of the garden

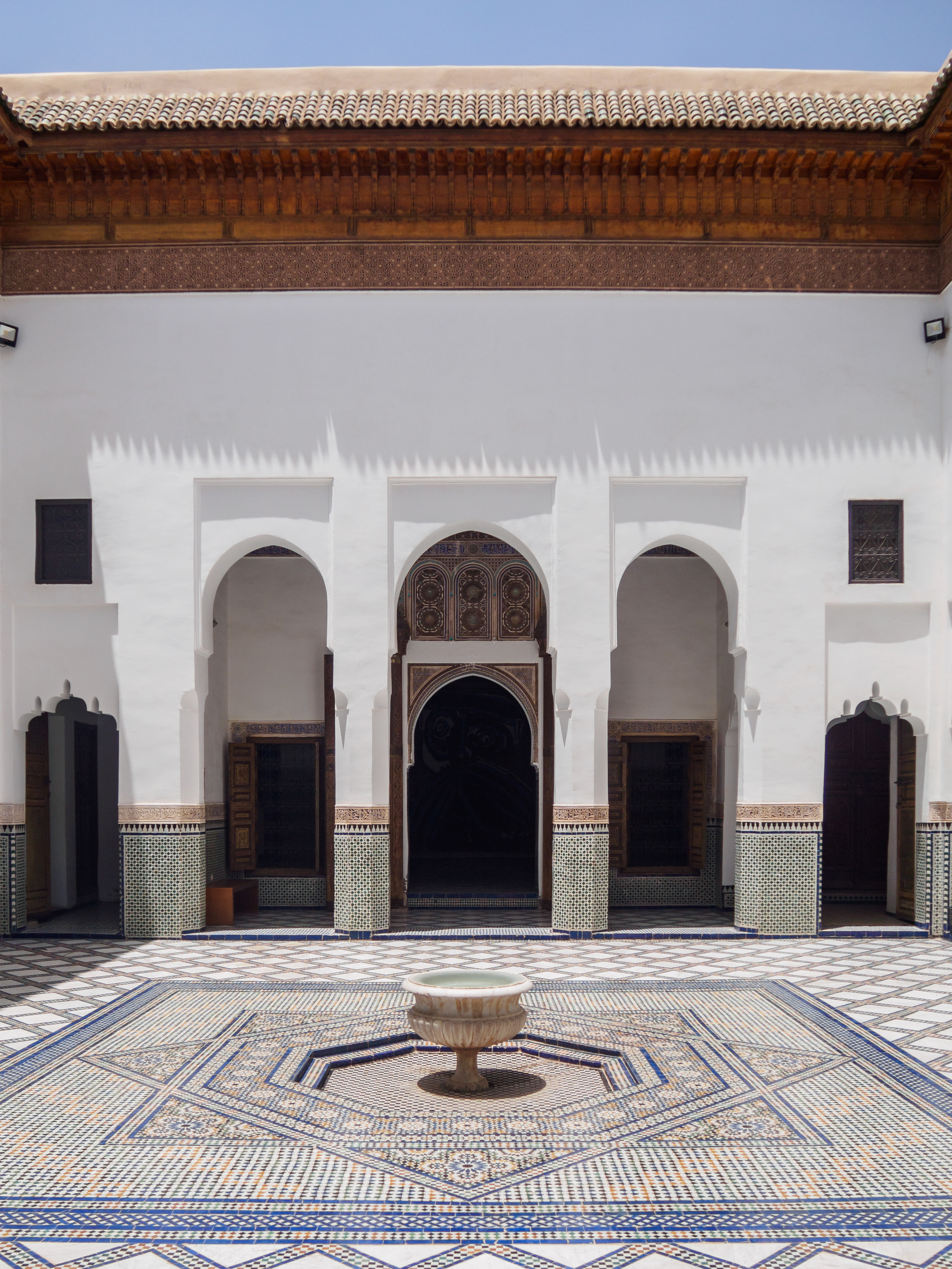
A courtyard with fountain in the palace

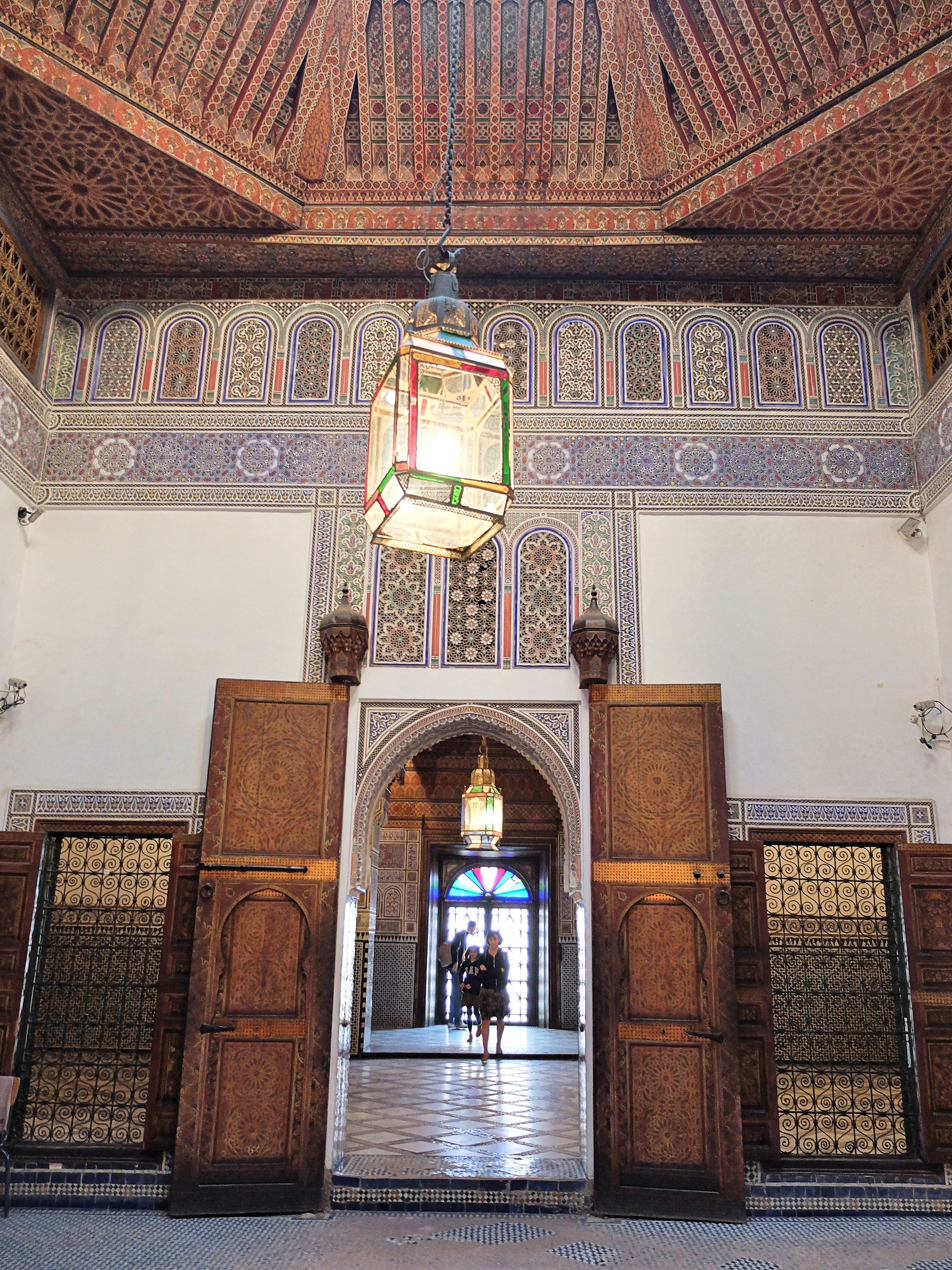
One of the grand halls in the palace

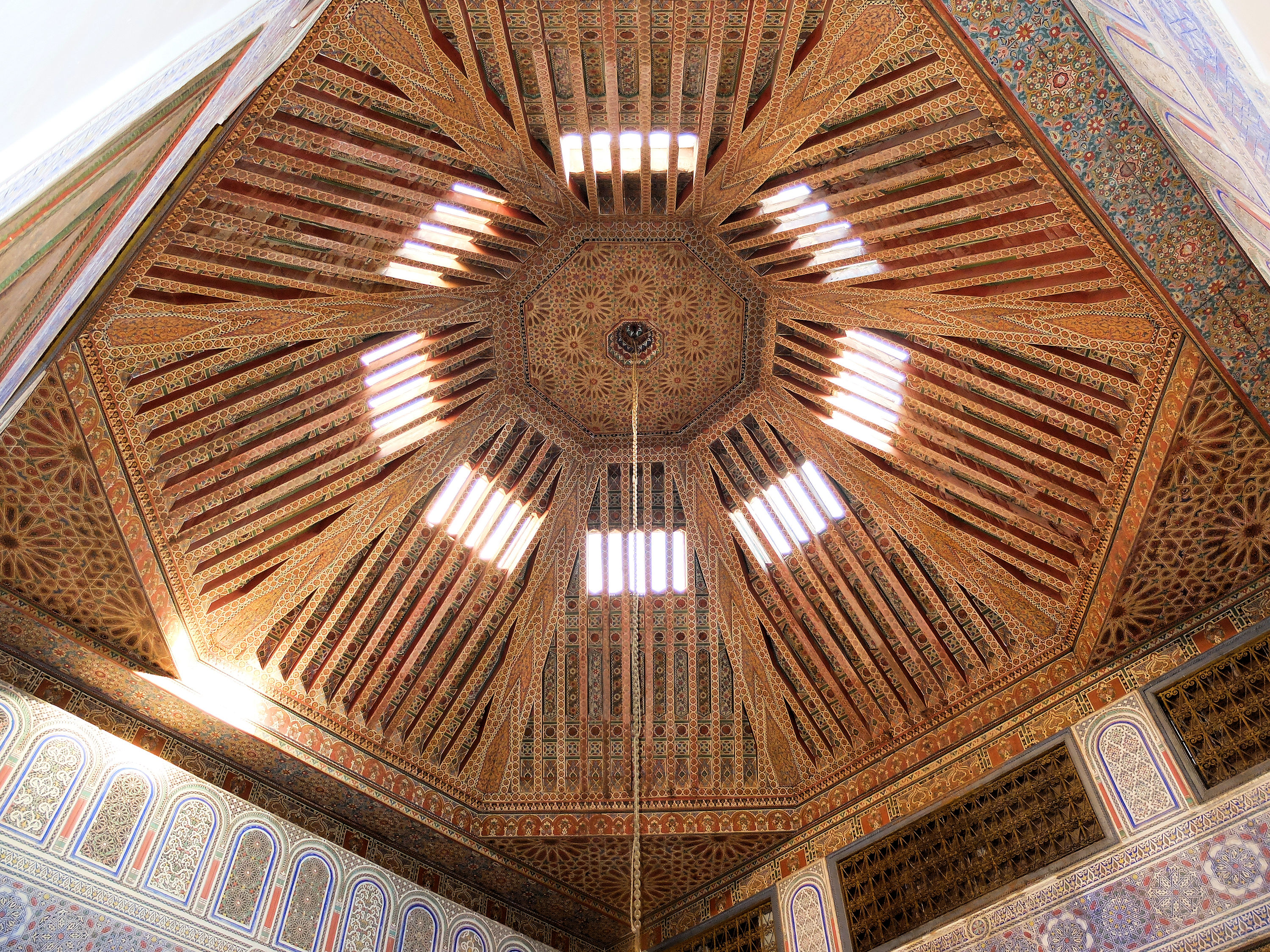
Cupola over the grand hall

== Museum collection ==
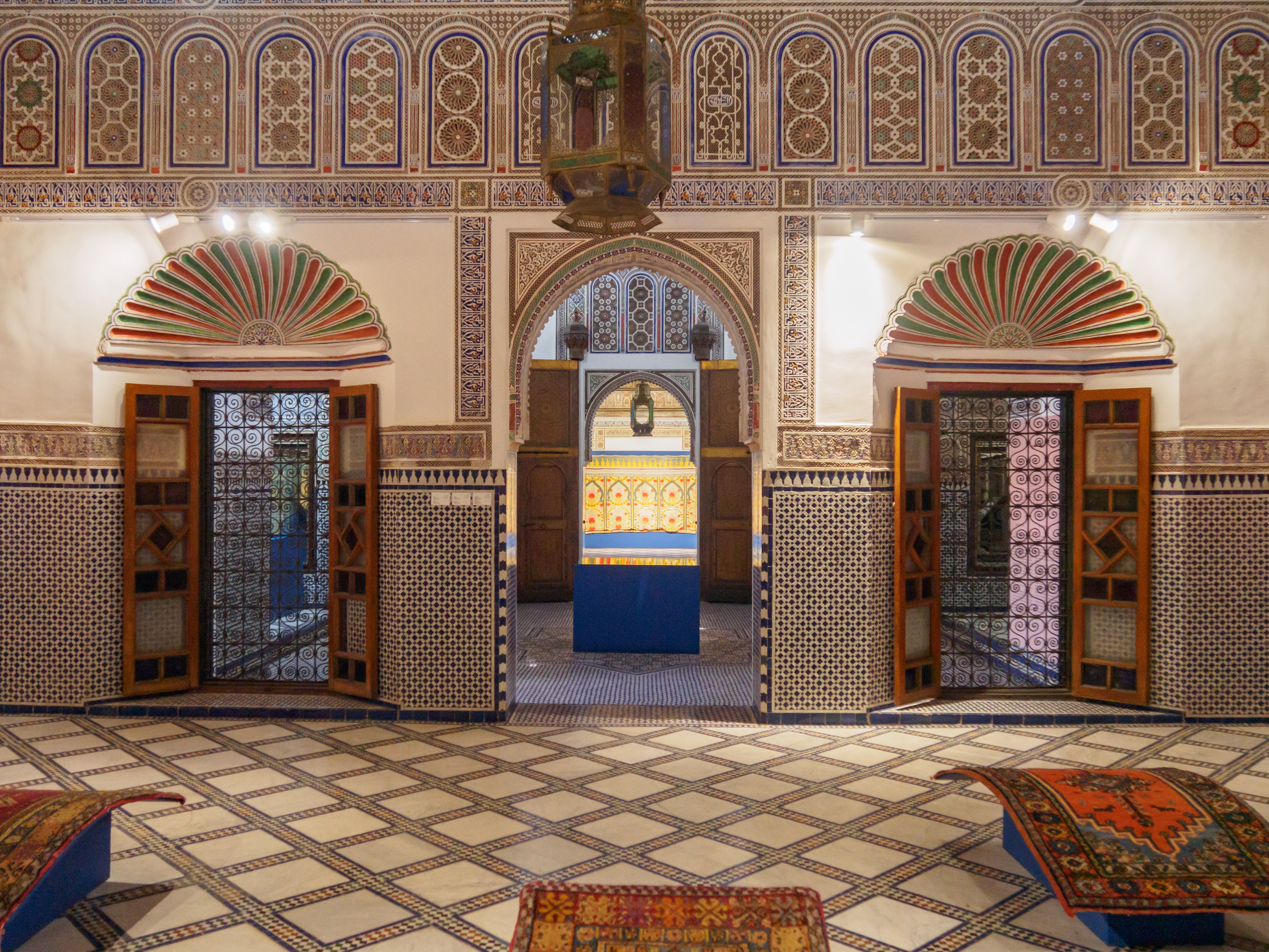
Rooms of the palace with exhibit on Moroccan carpets

The museum collections includes a wide variety of objects, many of them from the southern regions of Morocco. Until recently the museum's exhibits focused on Moroccan wooden art and objects. Its collection included an Andalusi marble basin crafted at Madinat al-Zahra between 1002 and 1007, which was later reused in the Ben Youssef Madrasa, where it was recently returned. Following the museum's reopening in 2018, its current exhibits now focus on weaving and Moroccan carpets.

== See also ==
- Marrakech Museum
- Bahia Palace
- Nejjarine Museum (in Fes)
