= Marrakech Museum =

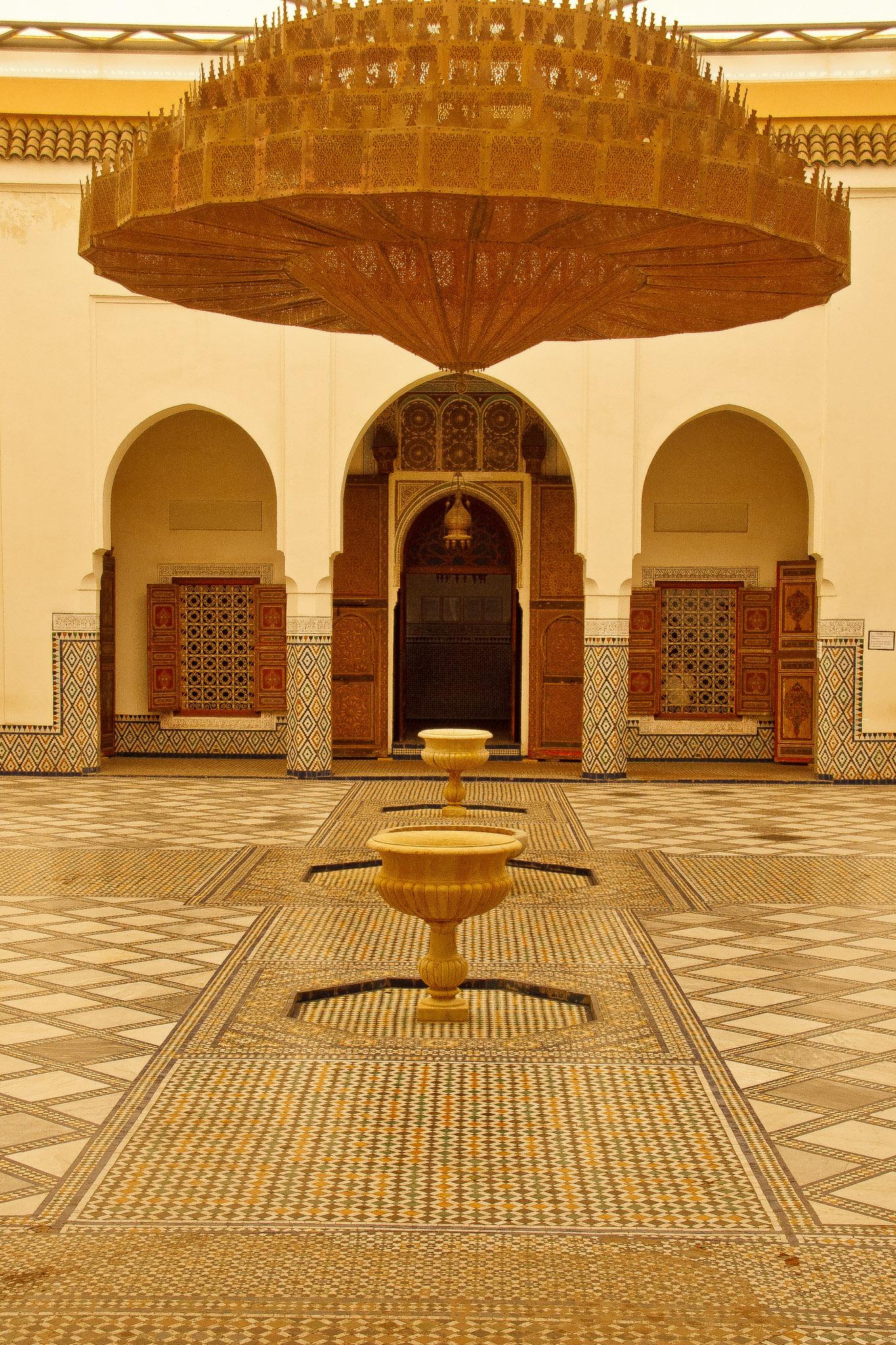
- Main courtyard of the Marrakech Museum
- Established: 1997
- Location: Marrakesh, Morocco
- Coordinates: 31.6312°N 7.9868°W
- Type: art museum
- Key holdings: numismatics, ceramics
- Collections: Moorish art

The Museum of Marrakech is a historic palace and museum located in the old center of Marrakesh, Morocco. In addition to its notable architecture, the museum's collection showcases various historic art objects and contemporary art from Morocco.

== History ==
The museum is housed in the Dar Mnebhi Palace, constructed at the beginning of the 20th century by Mehdi al-Mnebhi. Al-Mnebhi was a qaid of the Mnabha tribe and the vizier (minister) of war under Sultan Moulay Abdelaziz, from 1900 to 1908, replacing Ba Ahmad as the sultan's favourite. Al-Mnebhi also had other residences such as the Mnebhi Palace in Fez. His Marrakesh palace was later seized by the family of Pasha Thami El Glaoui, the autocratic ruler of southern Morocco under French rule, while Mnebhi was out of the country and serving as ambassador in London. After Morocco regained its independence (1956), the palace was seized by the state and in 1965 it was converted to a girls' school. After a period of neglect, the palace was carefully renovated by the Omar Benjelloun Foundation and converted into a museum in 1997.

== Architecture ==
The palace is an example of late 19th-century and early 20th-century Moroccan architecture, one of many such palaces built by wealthy elites during this period. The palace consists of a large central courtyard, which was originally an open riad garden planted with trees, but today is fully paved and roofed over. The courtyard is centered around several fountains and surrounded by roofed galleries and wall fountains, all decorated with colorful zellij tilework and painted and carved cedar wood. The courtyard today also contains a huge, central chandelier made up of brass pieces cut into ornate geometric and arabesque motifs. Various rooms branch off the courtyard, including chambers with more ornate wood and stucco decoration. The palace also had roof terraces with a menzeh (pavilion) that provided it with views over the rest of the city. It was also equipped with multiple facilities typical of large palaces, such as kitchens and a hammam (bathhouse) – the latter being distinguished by its characteristic domed and vaulted chambers.

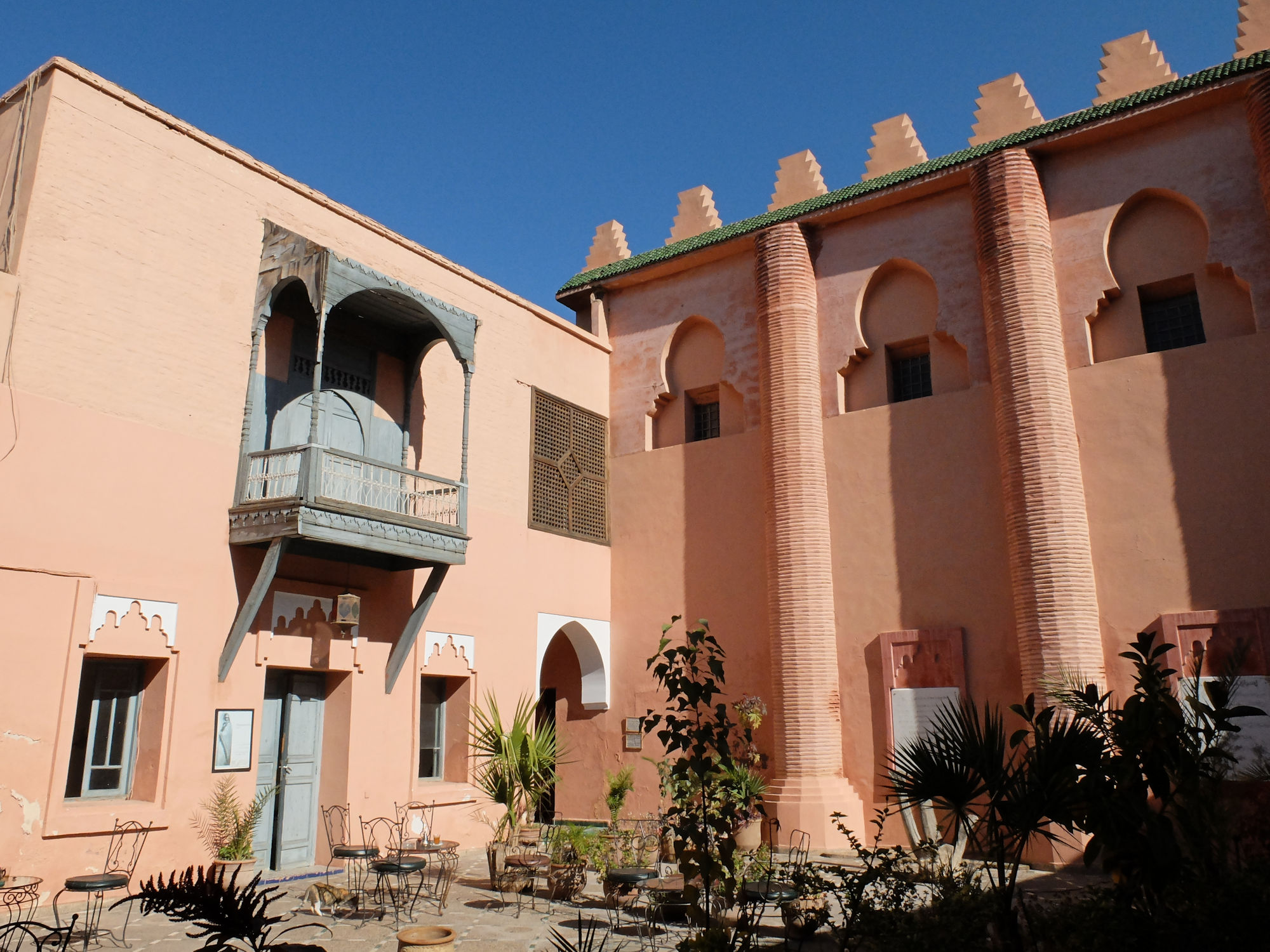
Entrance courtyard of the museum

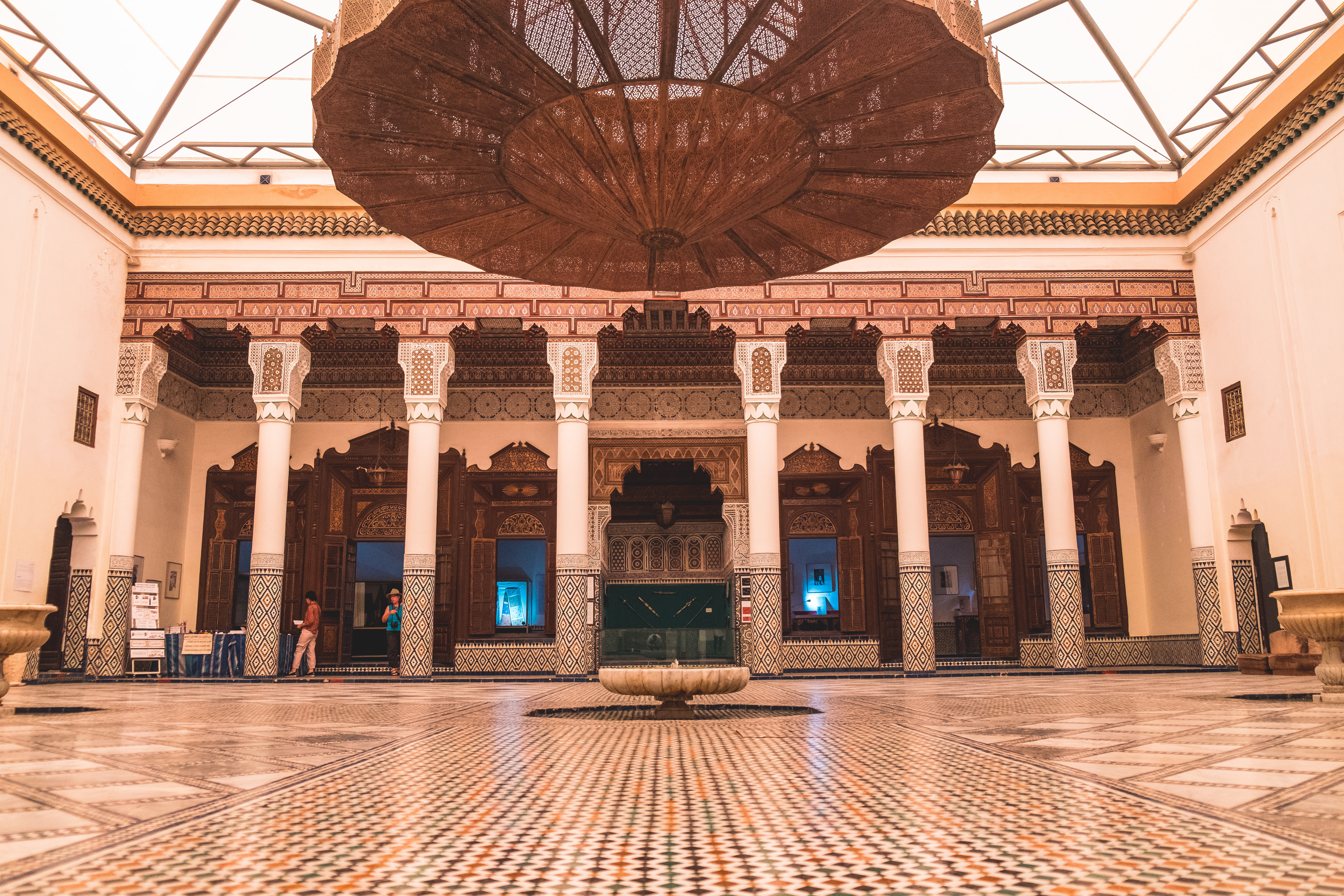
The main interior courtyard of the palace/museum

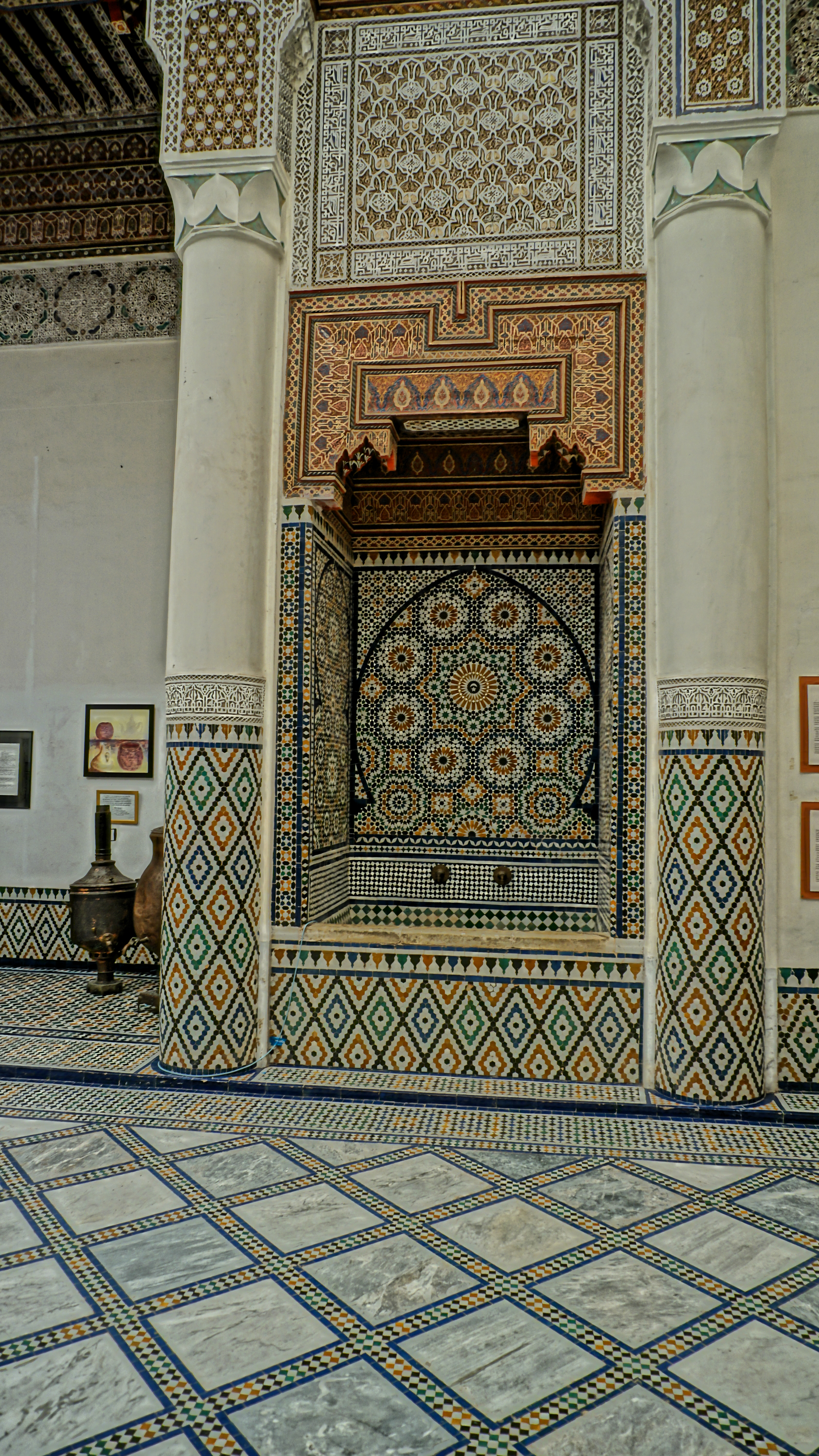
Ornate wall fountain in the main courtyard, with painted wood and zellij decoration

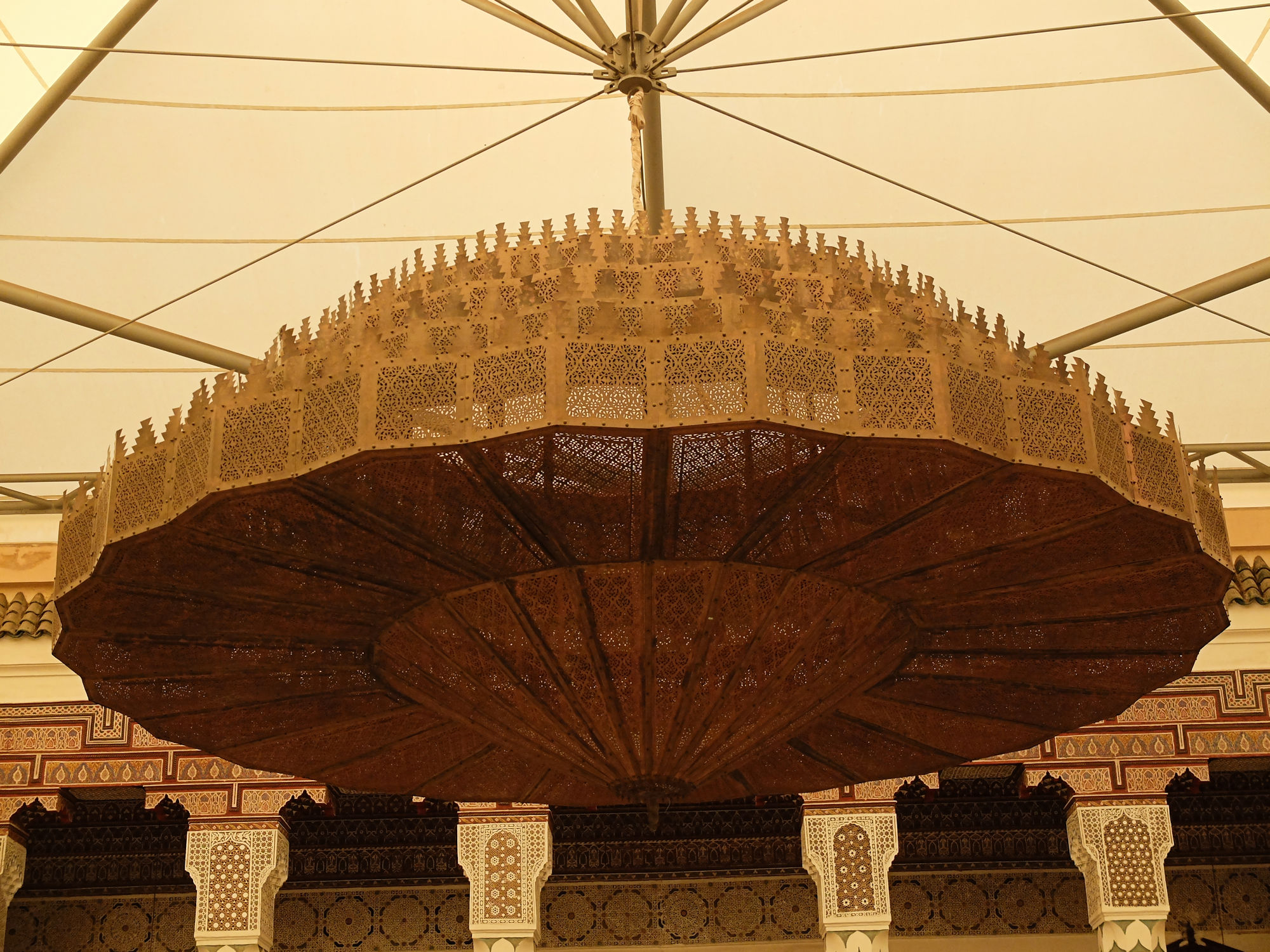
Brass chandelier over the middle of the courtyard

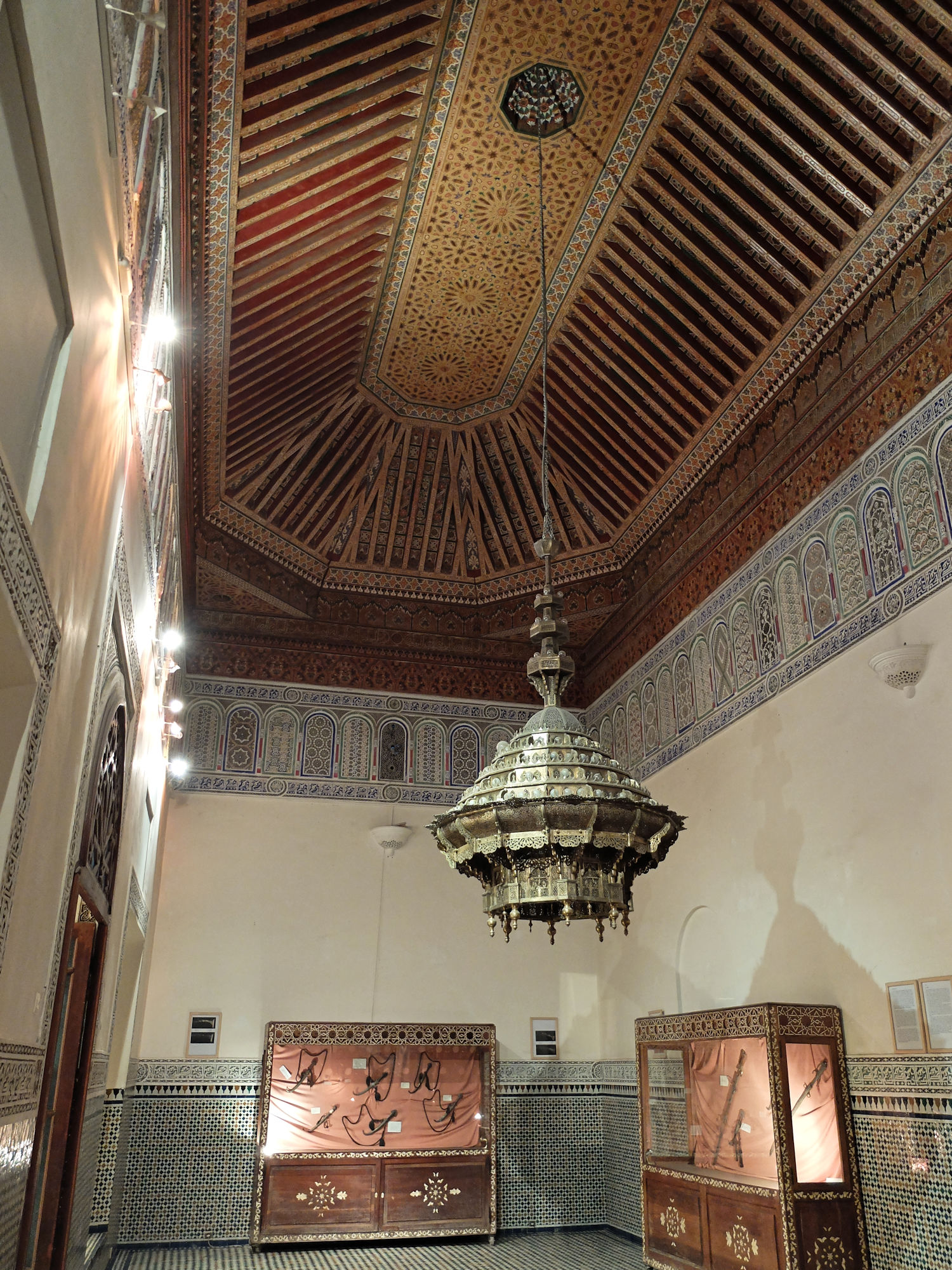
One of the chambers and exhibition rooms off the courtyard, with painted wood ceiling and stucco and zellij wall decoration

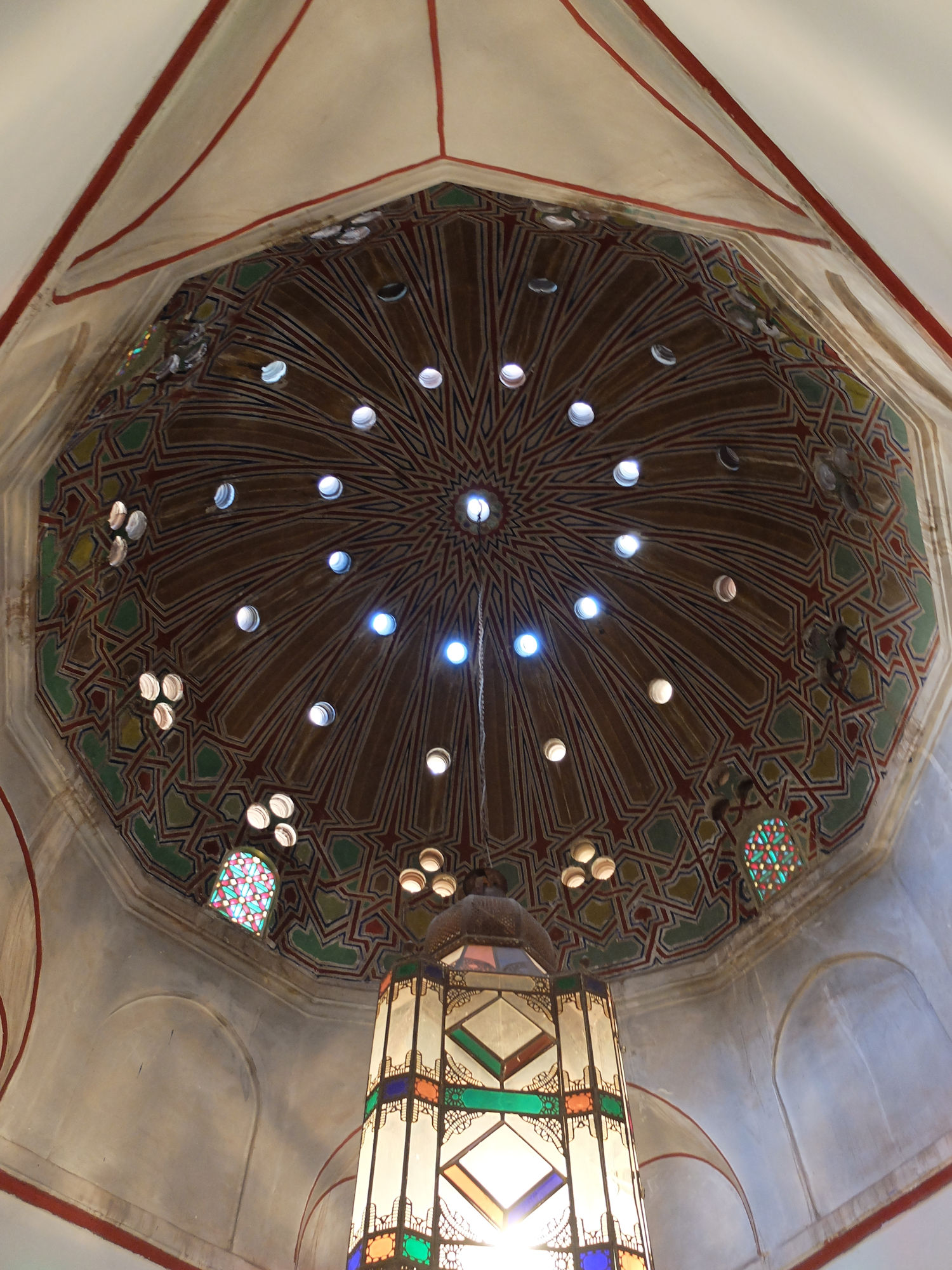
Domed ceiling in the hammam section of the palace

== Museum collection ==
The museum holds a diverse collection of traditional art objects from different regions of Morocco and different parts of its population, such as, weapons, carpets, costumes, pottery from Fez, Berber jewellery, Jewish liturgical objects, and more. The museum also holds exhibits of contemporary art and other themes in its kitchen and hammam sections, and sometimes hosts cultural events such as theatre and concerts.

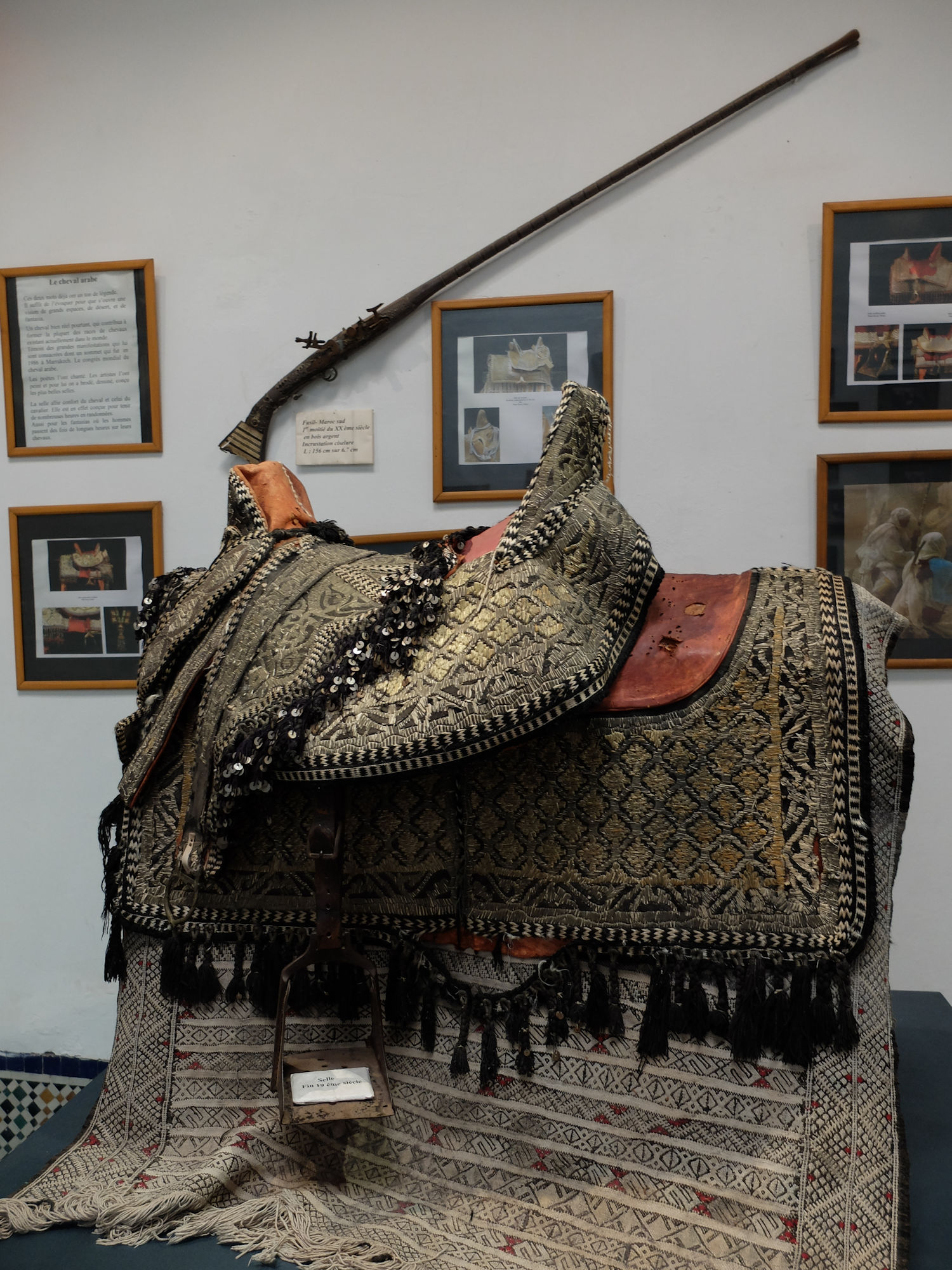
19th-century saddle on display in the museum (and historic rifle in the background)

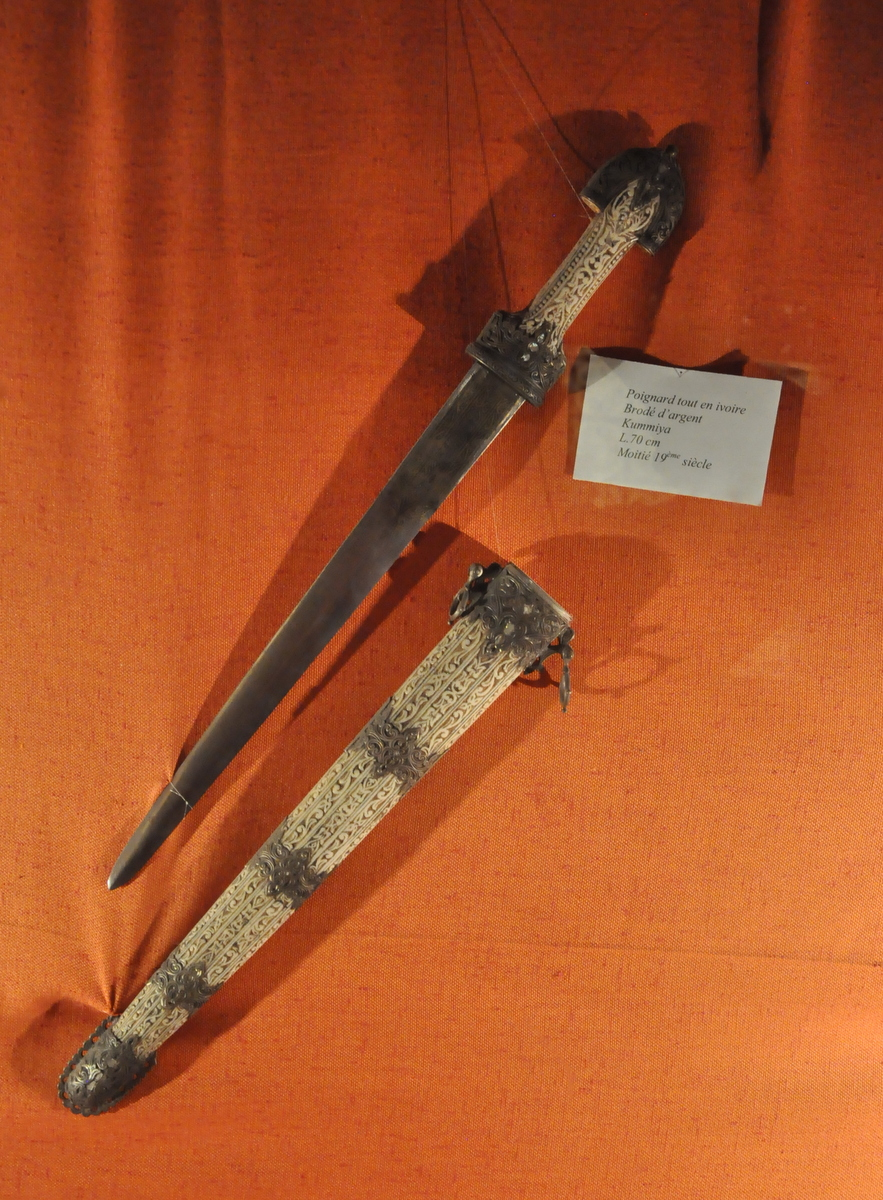
A 19th-century kummiya (dagger)

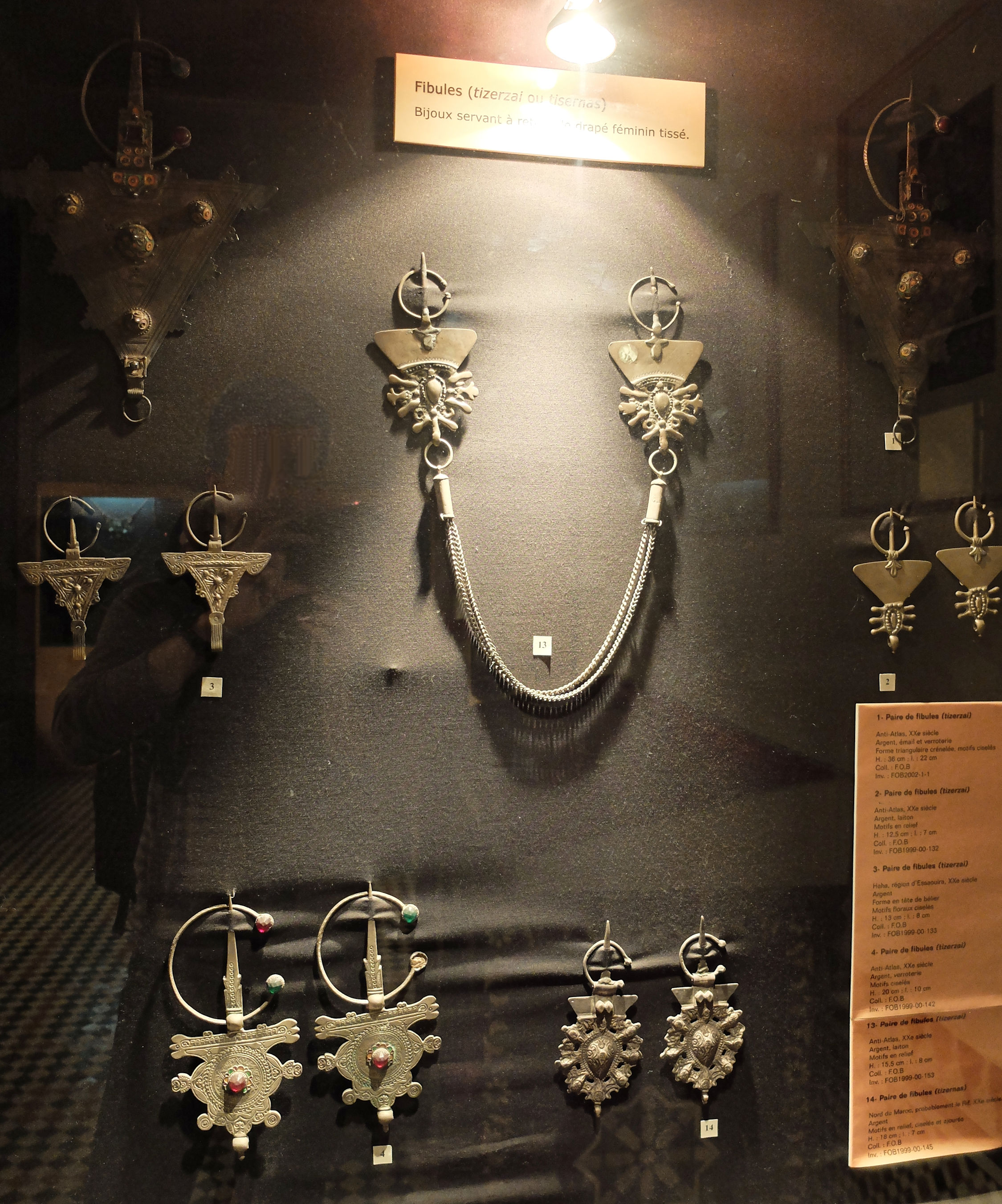
Berber jewellery (20th century)

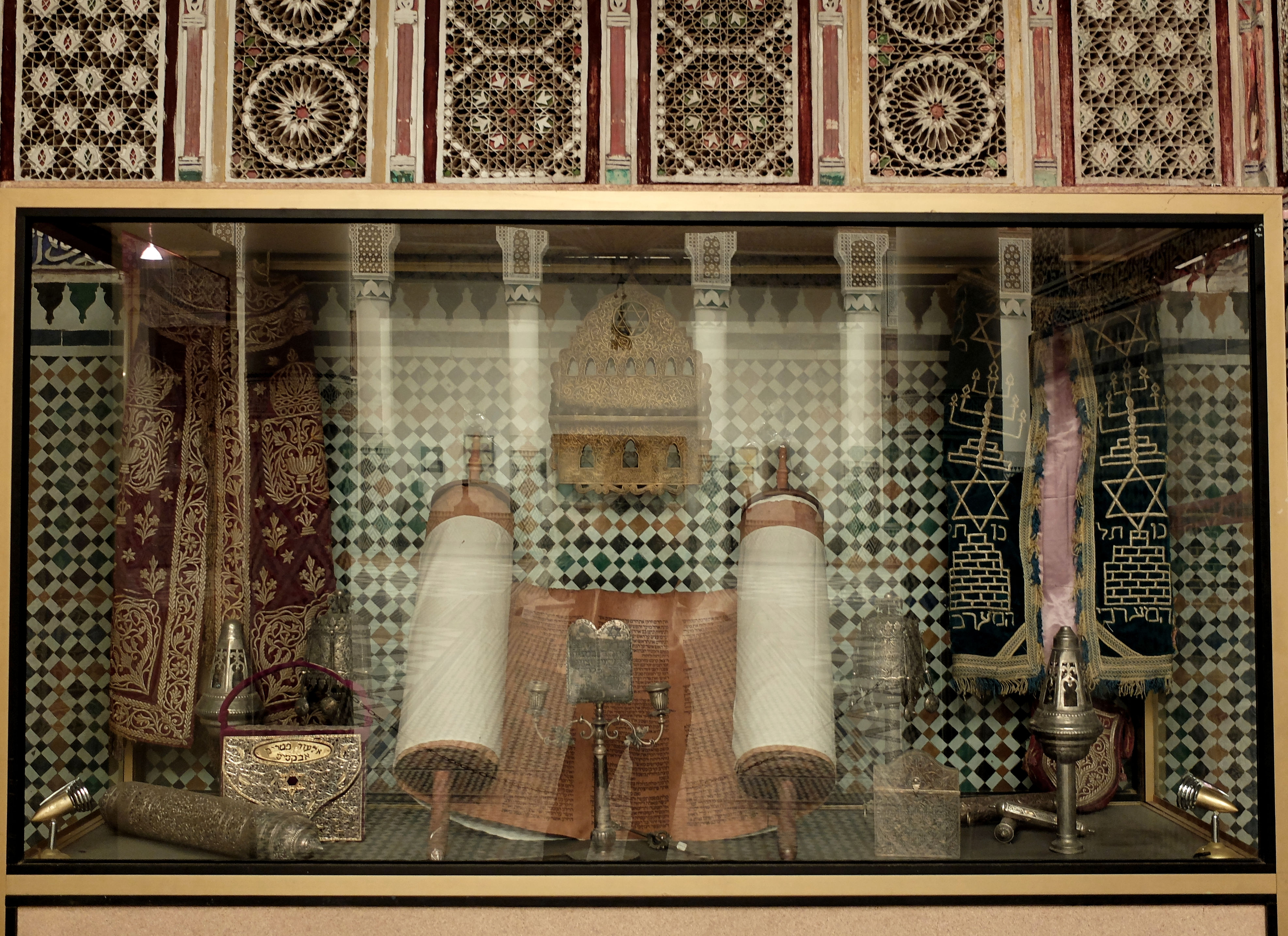
Jewish liturgical objects on display

== See also ==
- Dar Si Said (another arts and crafts museum in Marrakesh)
- Bahia Palace (major palace with similar architecture in Marrakesh)
- Dar Batha (similar museum in Fes)
