= Funduq Sagha =

Caravanserai in Fes, Morocco

Coordinates: 34°03′58″N 4°58′28.4″W

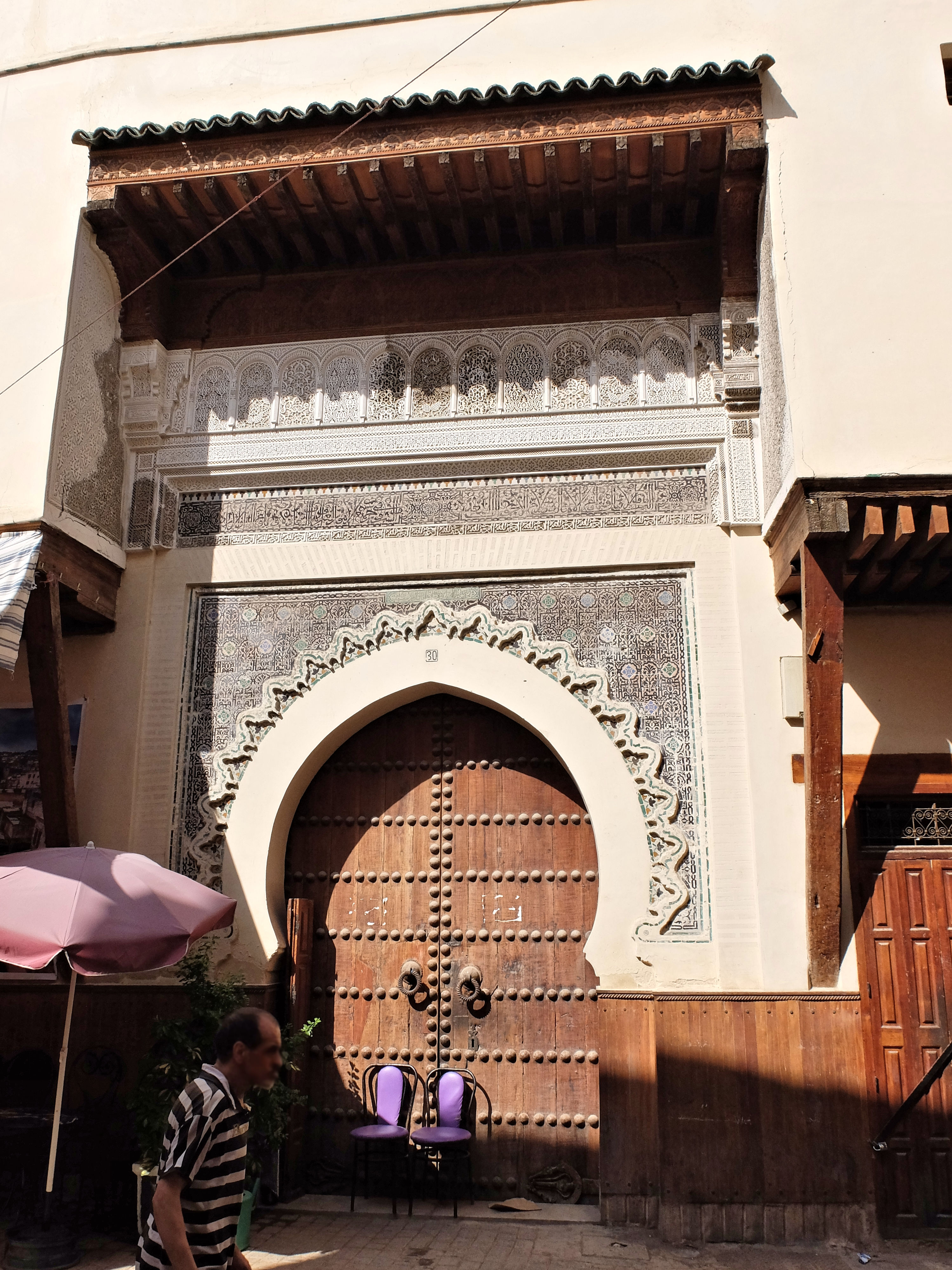
Entrance portal of Funduq Sagha

Funduq Sagha (Arabic: فندق الصاغة, lit. 'inn of the goldsmiths') (also spelled Fondouk Sagha) is a historic funduq (a caravanserai or traditional inn) in Fes el Bali, the old medina quarter in the city of Fez, Morocco.

== History ==
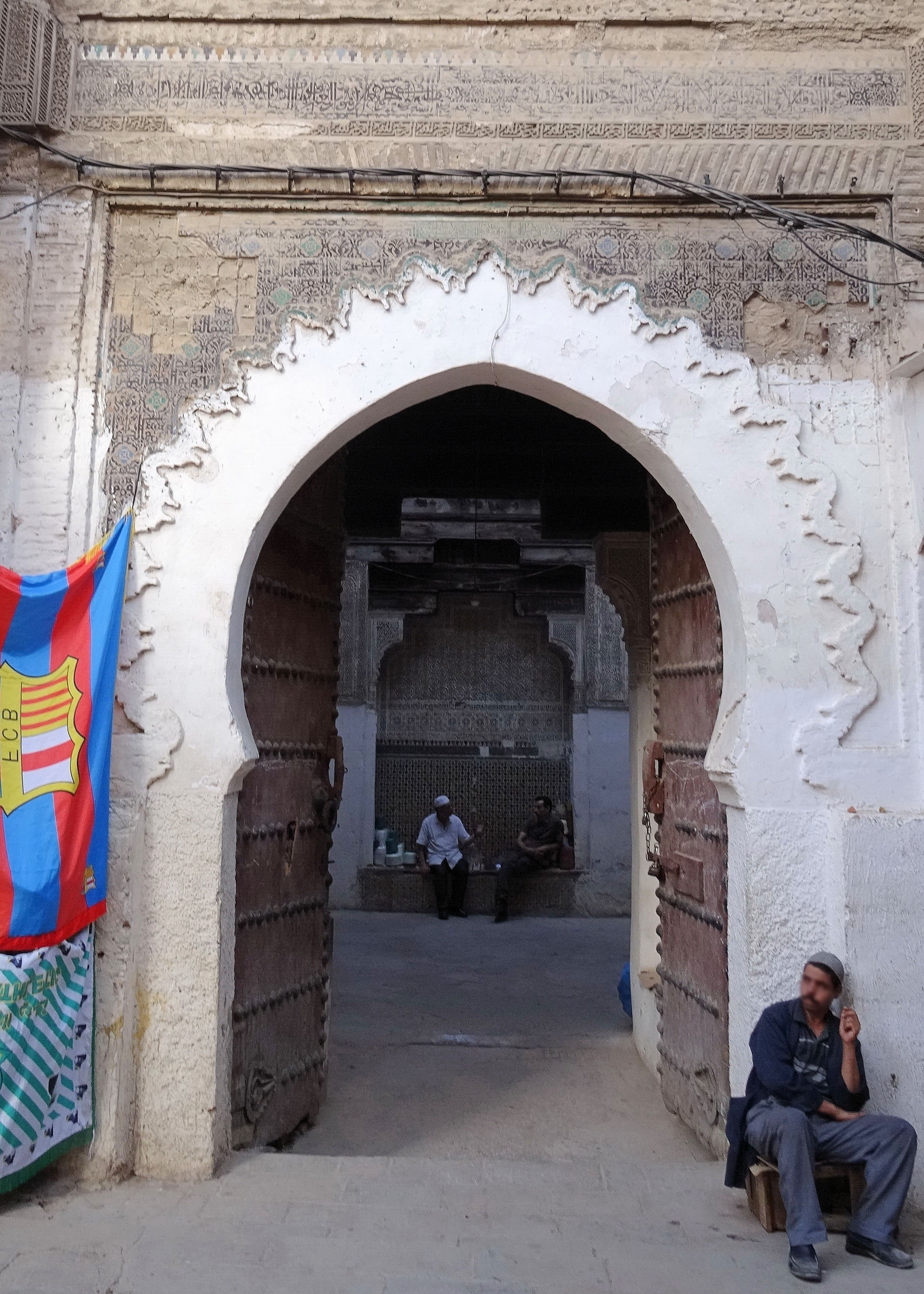
The entrance in 2014, prior to recent restoration

The funduq was built in 1711 CE (1123 AH) during the reign of the 'Alawi sultan Ismail Ibn Sharif, probably by the initiative of powerful local merchants or officials. Like other buildings of its type, it served as a center of commercial activity and merchant dealings, and became one of the most important ones in Fes. The ground floor of the building was devoted exclusively to commercial activities, while the upper floors were taken up by artisan workshops and used for the storage of merchandise. In the early 20th century, it was particularly known for the sale of tea.

The funduq recently underwent a major restoration between 2013 and 2017 within the framework of an initiative to rehabilitate 27 historic monuments in Fes. During the restoration process, archaeological excavations were also carried out and revealed the remains of Marinid-era (13th–15th century) houses with zellij decoration, some of whose foundations had been reused for the foundations of the funduq.

== Architecture ==
The architecture of the Funduq Sagha is very similar to that of another funduq founded in the same year (1711), the Funduq an-Najjariyyin (Arabic: فندق النجارين, lit. 'Inn of the carpenters'), which is used today as a museum and tourist attraction. Like the latter, it also faces a small square (known as Place Sagha) which is equipped with an old fountain.

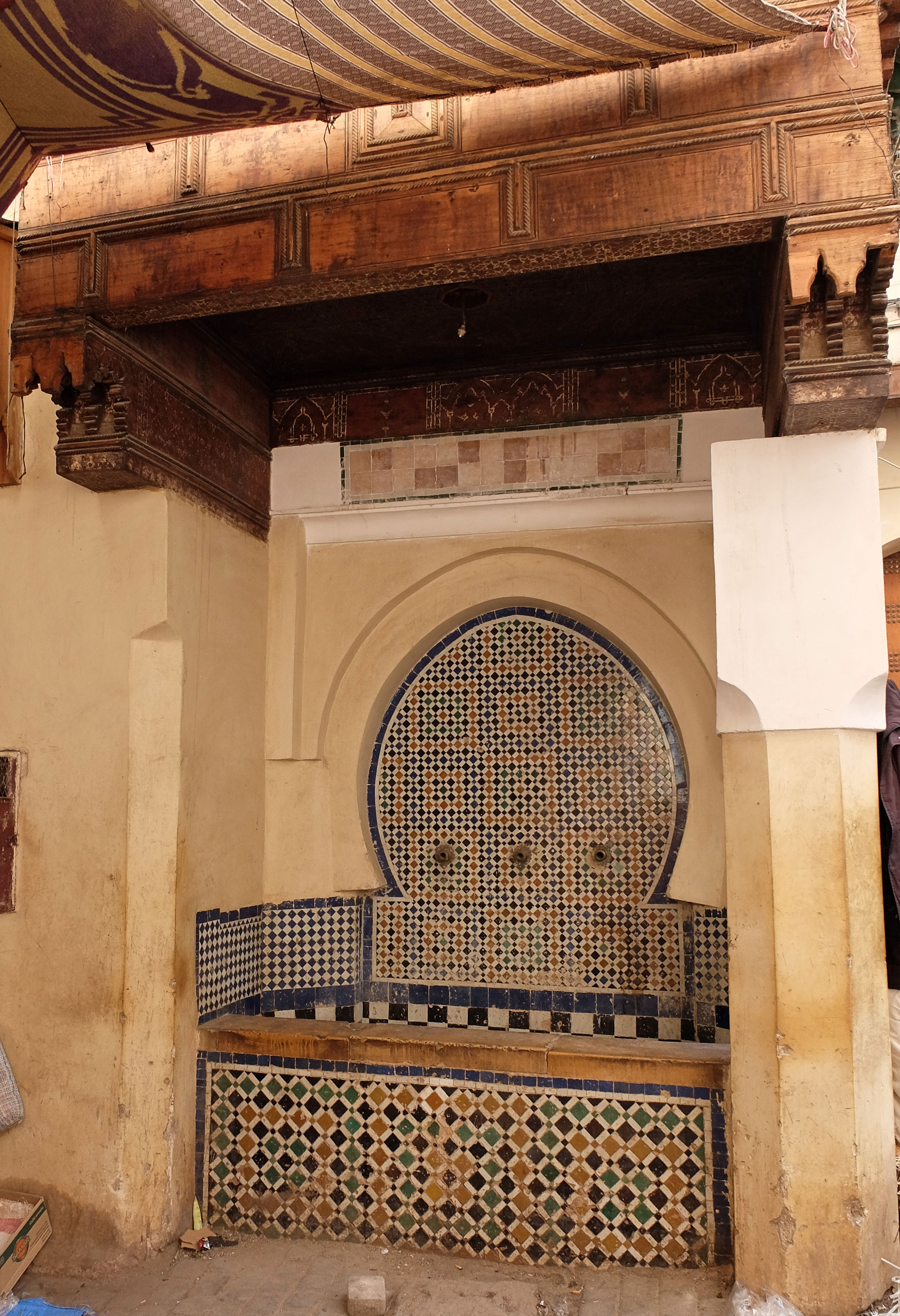
The wall fountain in the public square in front of the funduq

The funduq is entered via a monumental entrance portal decorated primarily with tilework painted with arabesque motifs and calligraphy. Above these tiles is a band of sculpted stucco decoration in traditional motifs, and above this a canopy of sculpted wood. Right above the summit of the doorway's arch is an Arabic inscription in tilework which records the date of the building's foundation:

.الحمد لله وحده والصلاة والسلام على من لا نبي بعده، وضع هذا الباب المبارک عام ثلاثة و مائة وألف وعشرون "Praise to God only, may God bless the one after whom there will be no more prophets. This blessed door was built in the year 1123."

Inside, the building is centered around a large courtyard with a disposition similar to the interior of the Funduq al-Najjariyyin. The building has three floors (including the ground floor). On the southern wall of the ground floor, opposite the entrance, is a monumental decorative niche covered in zellij, carved stucco, and sculpted wood, reminiscent of decorated street fountains. The courtyard is ringed by a gallery which stretches across all three floors and whose pillars are adorned, in their upper parts, with more carved stucco decoration. This gallery in turn grants access to over two dozen rooms distributed across the three floors.
