= Mnebhi Palace =

Palace in Fes, Morocco

Coordinates: 34°3′46.7″N 4°58′44.4″W

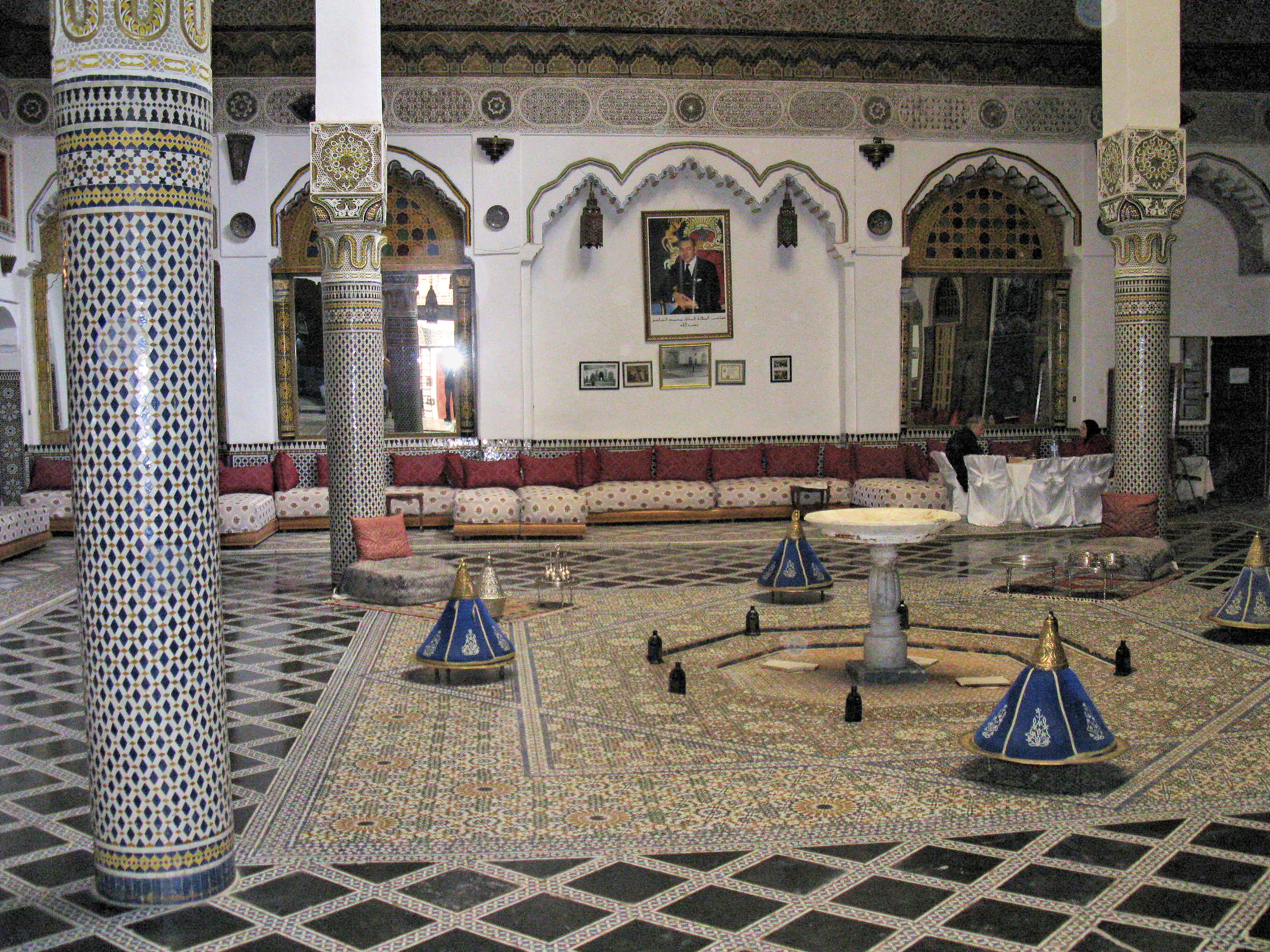
The main hall of the palace

The Mnebhi Palace or Menebhi Palace (Arabic: دار منبهي, romanized: Dar Mnebhi), also known by its French name Palais Mnebhi, is a historic early 20th-century palace in Fes el-Bali, the old medina of Fes, Morocco. It is notable for both its lavish architecture as well as for being the place where the 1912 Treaty of Fes was officially signed. It is located on Tala'a Seghira street, one of the main souq streets of the city.

== History ==
The palace was built by Mehdi Mnebhi (who also built another palace which hosts the Marrakech Museum today) at the beginning of the 20th century. Mnebhi was the defense minister of Sultan Abdelaziz between 1900 and 1908, replacing Ba Ahmad as the sultan's favourite. In 1912, the palace hosted the signing of the Treaty of Fes which established French colonial rule over Morocco. It then served as the first residence of the French resident-general, Lyautey, before this function moved to the Dar al-Baida and Dar Batha palaces to the west. It later served as the first headquarters of the Istiqlal (Independence) party in Morocco. Today it is used as a restaurant venue for tour groups.

== Architecture ==
The palace is among the most lavishly decorated in Fes. It features a vast reception hall with a high wooden dome-like ceiling upheld by four columns, as well as a large wall fountain decorated with intricate zellij mosaic tiles. On the western and eastern sides of the hall are two other ornately decorated rooms.

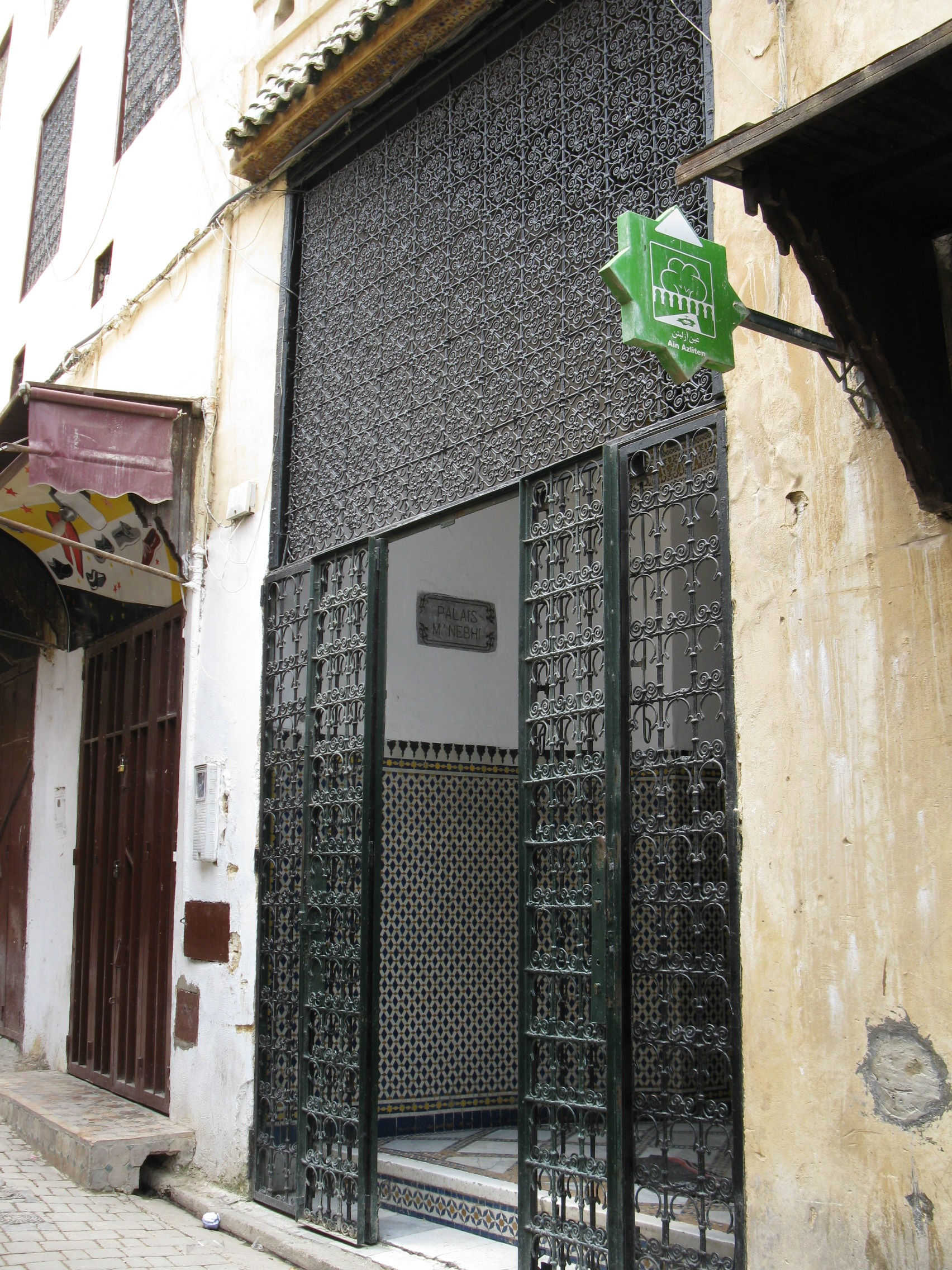
The street entrance of the palace

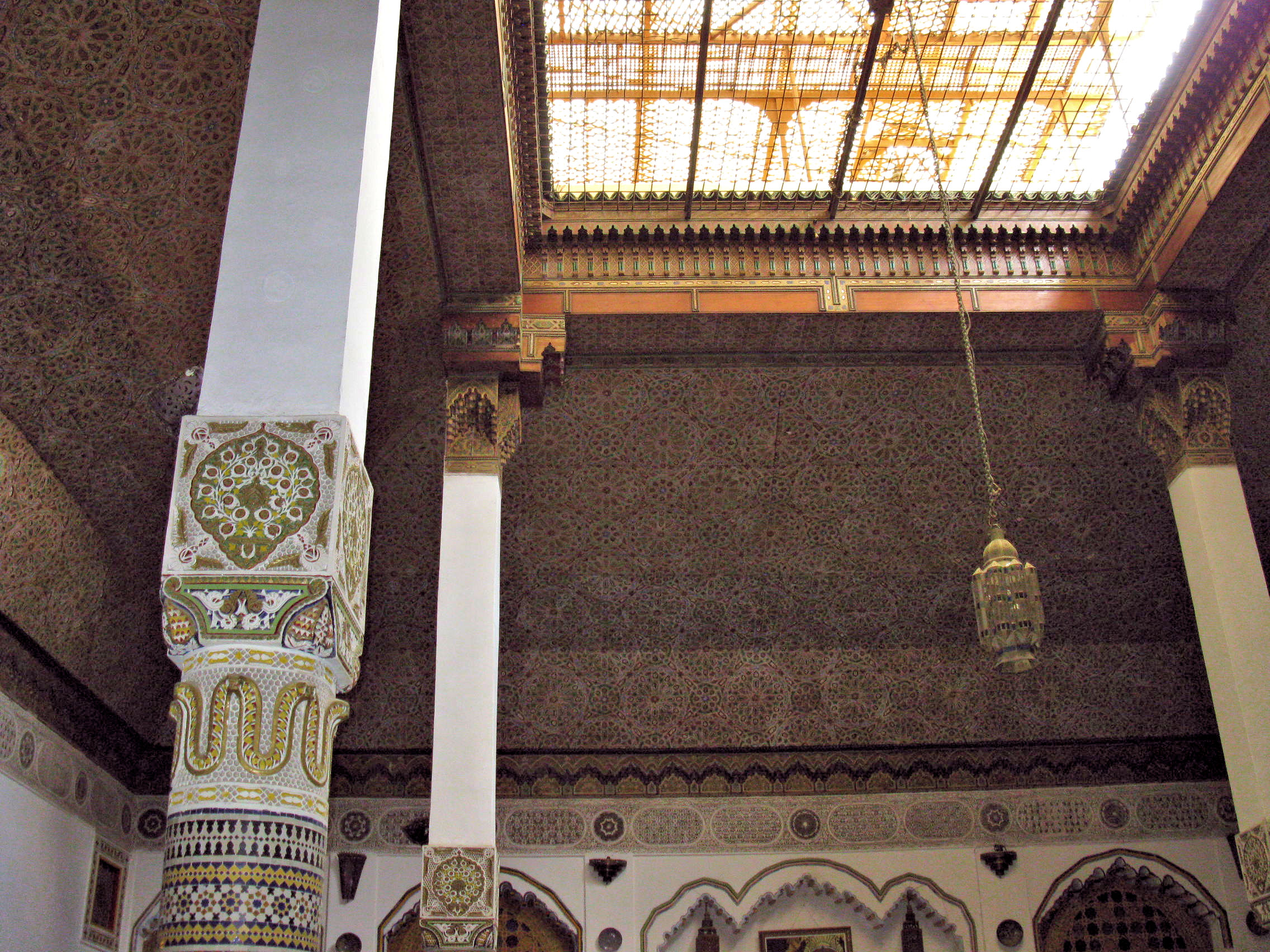
Ceiling of the main hall

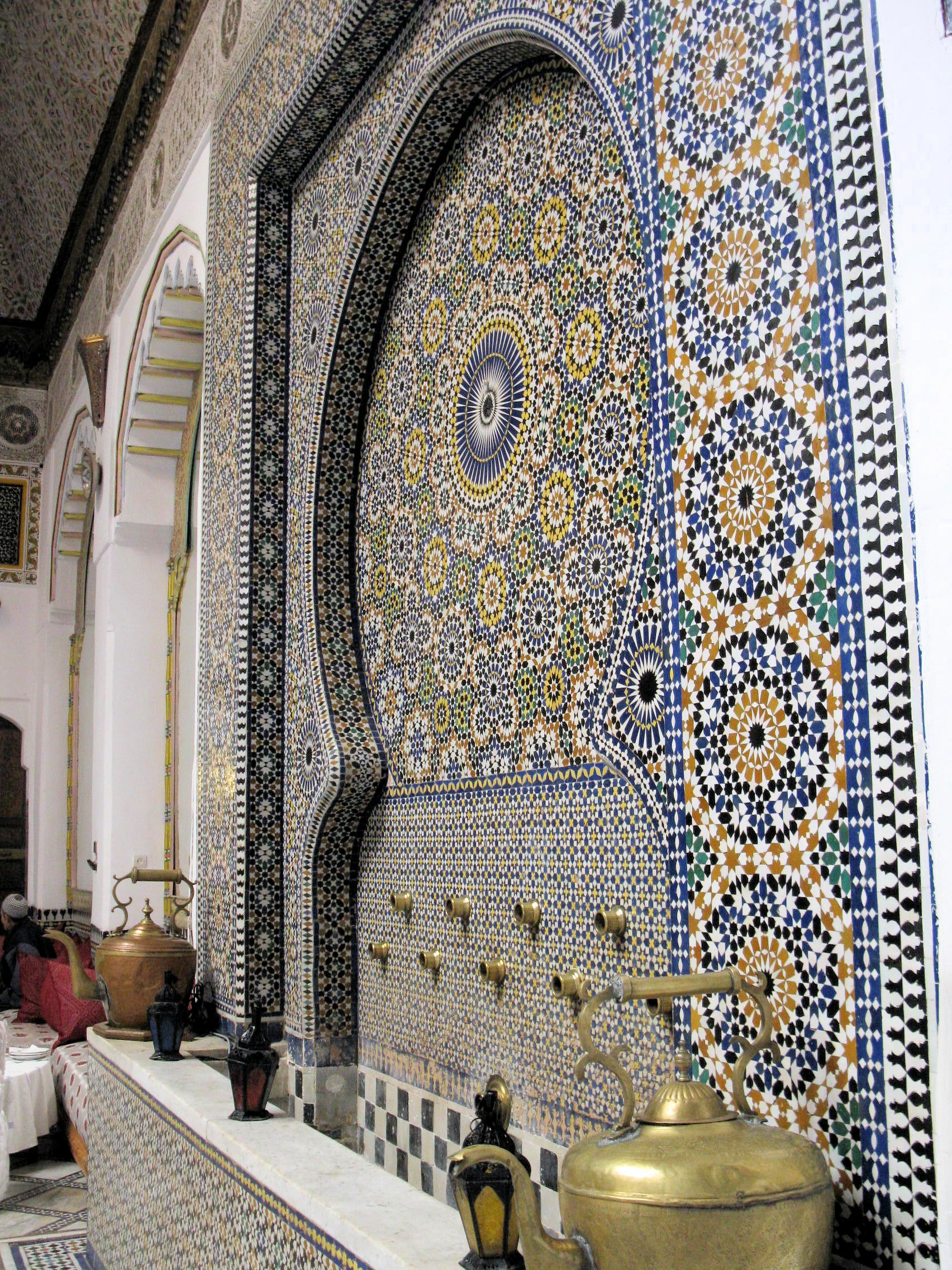
Wall fountain in the main hall

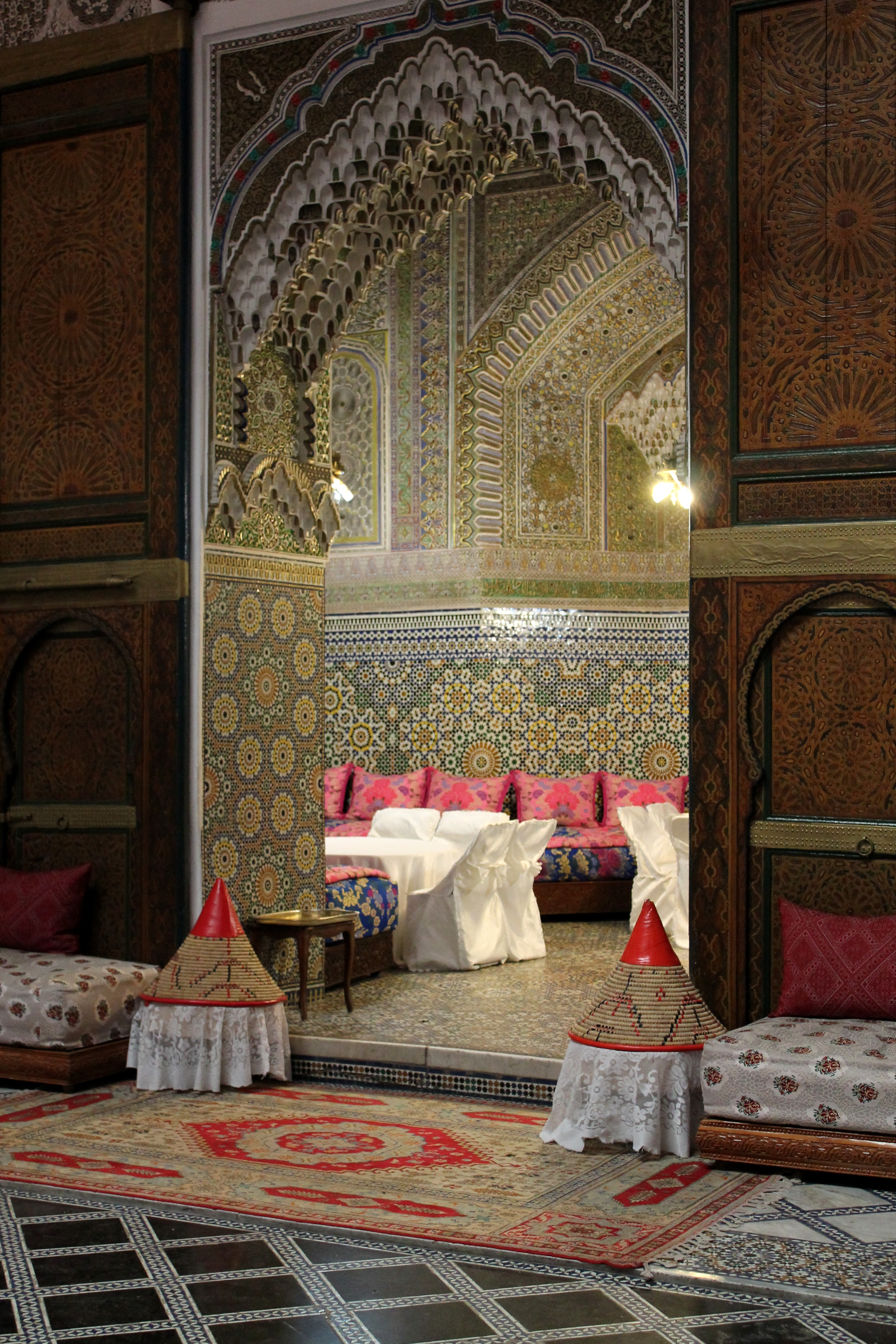
Doorway to one of the side rooms off the main hall
