= Funduq al-Najjarin =

Historical building and museum in Fez, Morocco

- فندق النجارين
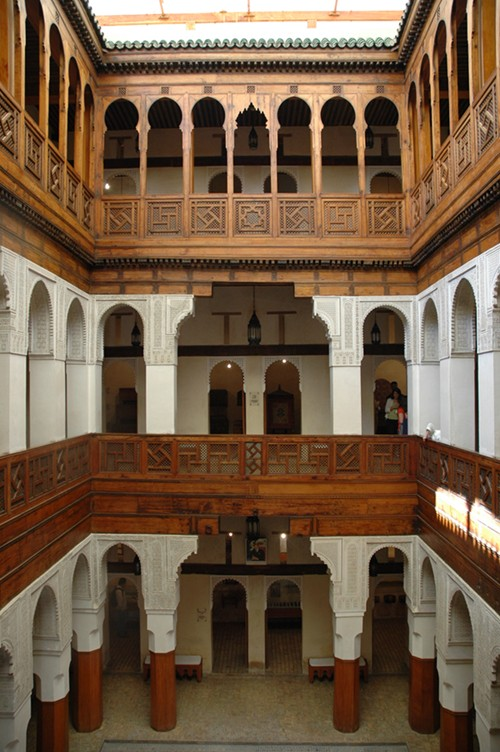
- Courtyard of the funduq.
- Interactive map of the Funduq al-Najjarin area

General information
- Type: funduq (caravanserai)
- Architectural style: Marinid, Moroccan, Islamic
- Location: Fes, Morocco
- Coordinates: 34°03′53″N 4°58′33″W
- Completed: 1711 CE (1123 AH)
- Renovated: 1990-1996

Technical details
- Material: cedar wood, brick, stucco, tile
- Floor count: 3

Funduq al-Najjarin (Arabic: فندق النجارين, lit. 'Inn of the carpenters'; also transliterated as Fondouk el-Nejjarine) is a historic funduq (a caravanserai or traditional inn) in Fes el Bali, the old medina quarter in the city of Fez, Morocco.

The funduq is situated in the heart of the medina, at Al-Najjarin Square (also: Nejjarine Square or Place Nejjarine), which is also notable for the Nejjarine Fountain, an attached saqayya or traditional public fountain. The building was designed for use by the merchants, traders, and visitors to the city of Fez and provided a storage place. Along with the fountains, the building forms one of the most remarkable urban architectural complexes in historic Fez. Today it houses a private museum, Le Musée Nejjarine des Arts et Métiers du Bois (Nejjarine Museum of Wooden Arts & Crafts).

== History ==
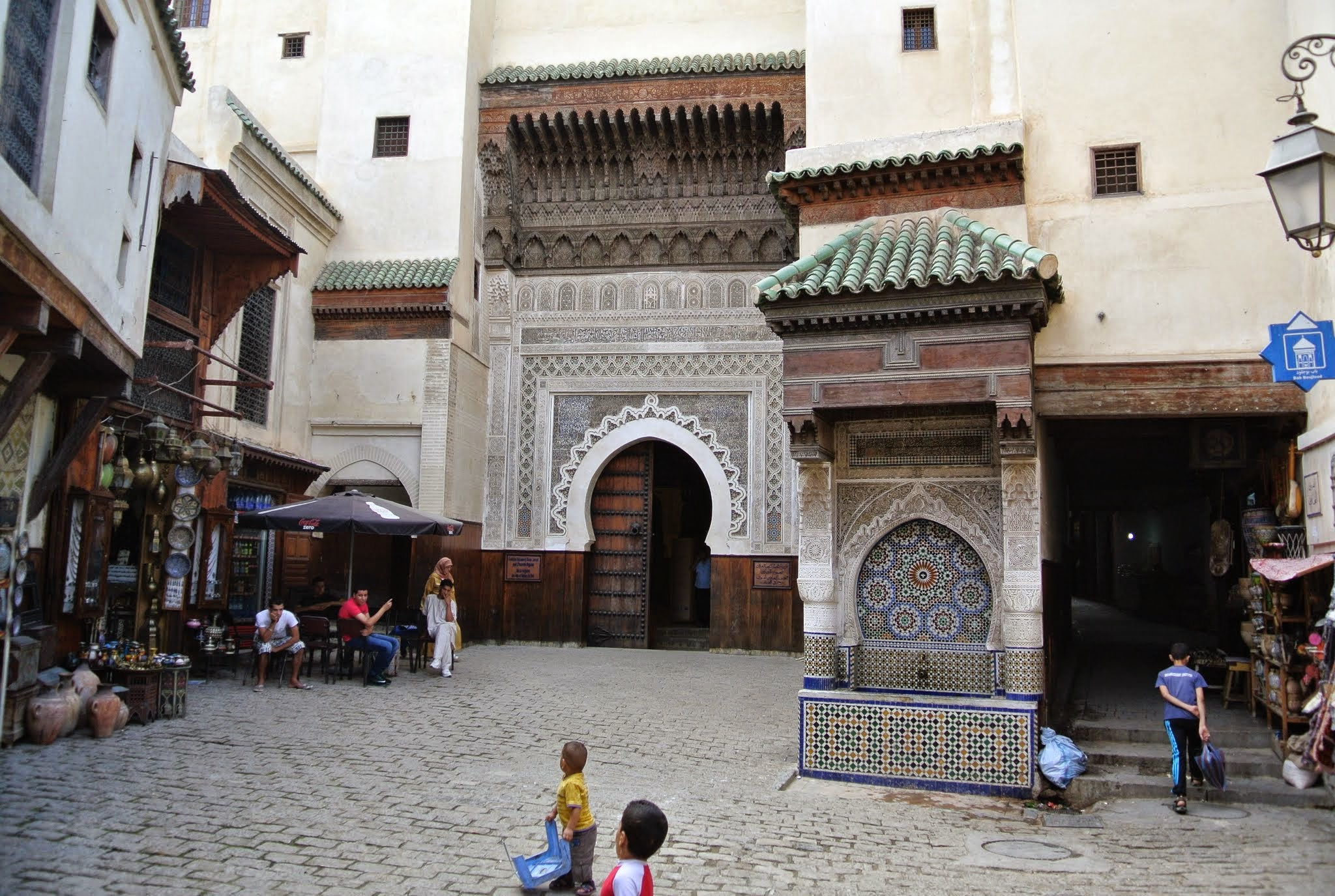
Place an-Nejjarine today, with the funduq on the left and the fountain on the right

The name al-Najjarin (or the French transliteration Nejjarine, from Arabic: النجارين) means "carpenters", a reference to the historic presence of a carpenters' souq (market) around the square in front of the funduq today. The souq is believed to have existed since the Marinid era (1244-1465 CE).

The funduq was commissioned by the amin (provost or magistrate) 'Adiyil in 1711, under the reign of the 'Alawi sultan Ismail Ibn Sharif. Another funduq founded in the same year (1711), the Funduq Sagha (Arabic: فندق الصاغة, lit. 'inn of the goldsmiths') in northern Fes el-Bali, also exhibits a very similar architecture and decorative style. The saqayya (fountain) attached to the Funduq al-Najjarin was commissioned in the 19th century by the Sultan Abd al-Rahman (ruled 1822–1859).

Despite these developments from different dates, the various structures and the public square form an integrated whole in the local community. The building was originally used as a trading center, caravanserai (inn), and merchant warehouse associated closely with the Makhzen (the government or royal authorities). It likely continued to serve this function up until the beginning of the 20th century. Prior to colonial rule, a small number of rooms in the establishment were owned by some of the city's Jewish merchants. By the 19th century, a post office for the city of Fez also existed between the funduq and the fountain, operating out of a small shop.

The funduq was classified as a national historic monument in 1916 and was used as a police station by the French colonial authority in the 1940s. The building was restored between 1990 and 1996, and on May 23, 1998, it was reopened as a private museum for wood arts and crafts known as Le Musée Nejjarine des Arts et Métiers du Bois.

== Architecture ==
=== The funduq ===
The building is built on an almost symmetrical rectangular plan. The interior is accessed through a monumental entrance leading to a vestibule and a central courtyard. The entrance gate, 5 meters tall and 3 meters wide, is framed by a façade of rich floral and geometrical decorations and inscriptions in carved stucco and tilework, and overlooked by an impressive carved cedar wood canopy. The carved or painted motifs include floral arabesques and Arabic epigraphy. The funduq is one of the few monumental buildings in Fez which has a complete exterior façade visible from the street.

Inside, the building is centered around a main rectangular courtyard, as in other funduqs. This space is surrounded by a three-story gallery on all sides giving access to many different rooms. The galleries are fronted on the inner courtyard side by a balustrade of wooden arches and mashrabiyas. The ground floor rooms were used to store merchandise, while accommodations for guests were located on the upper floors.

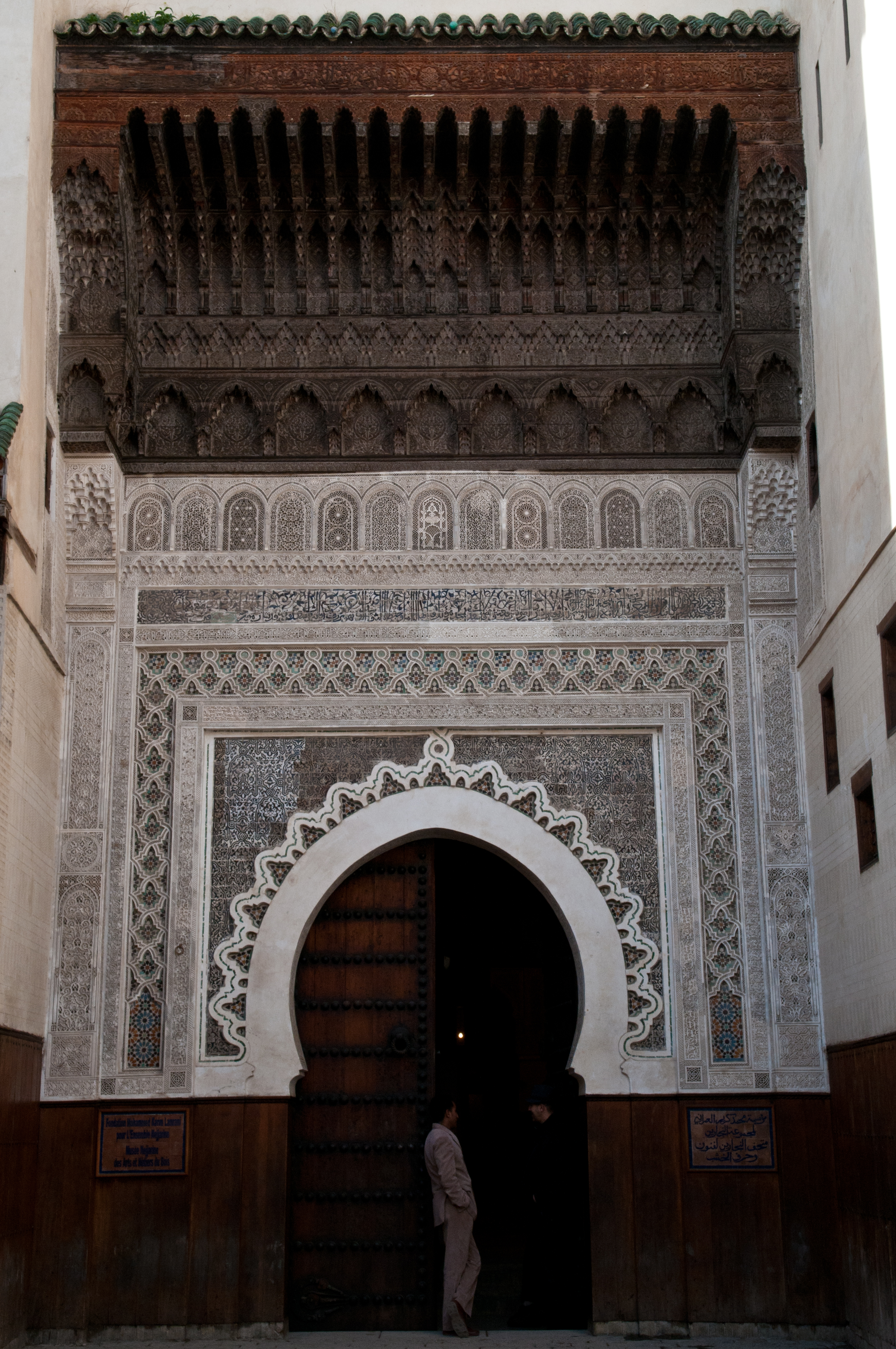
The portal and facade of the funduq

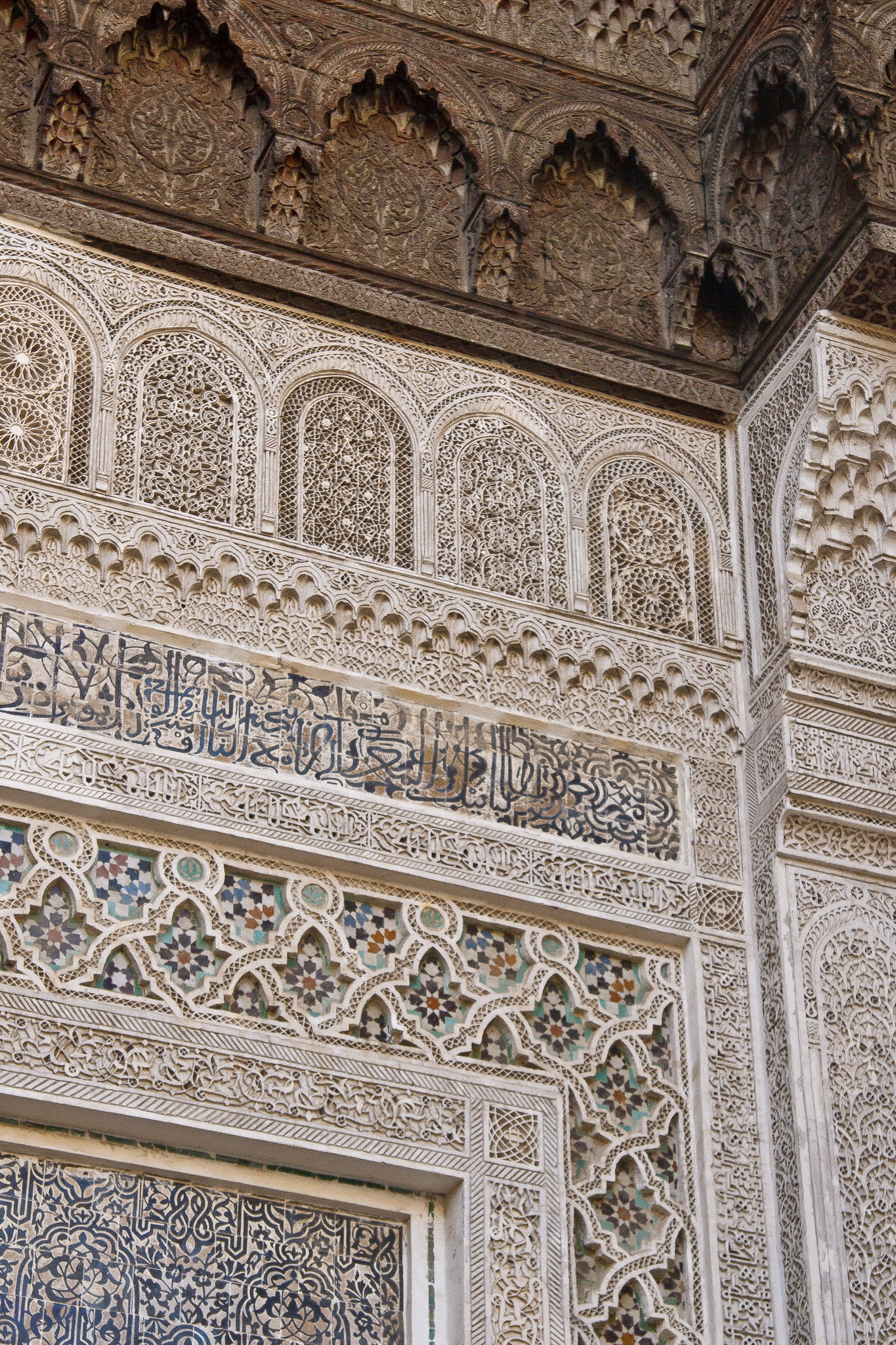
Details of the decoration of the portal

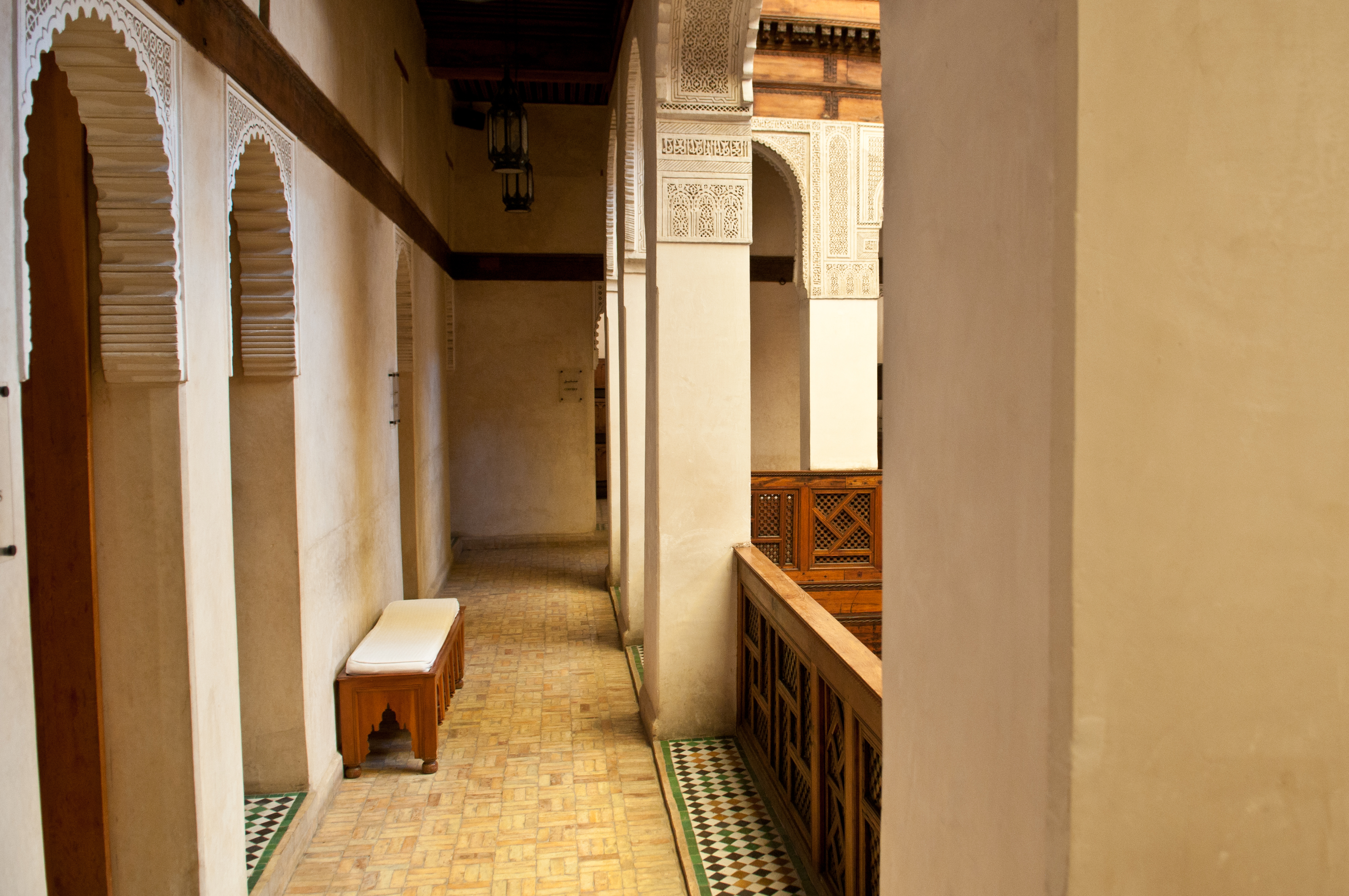
Gallery around the second floor

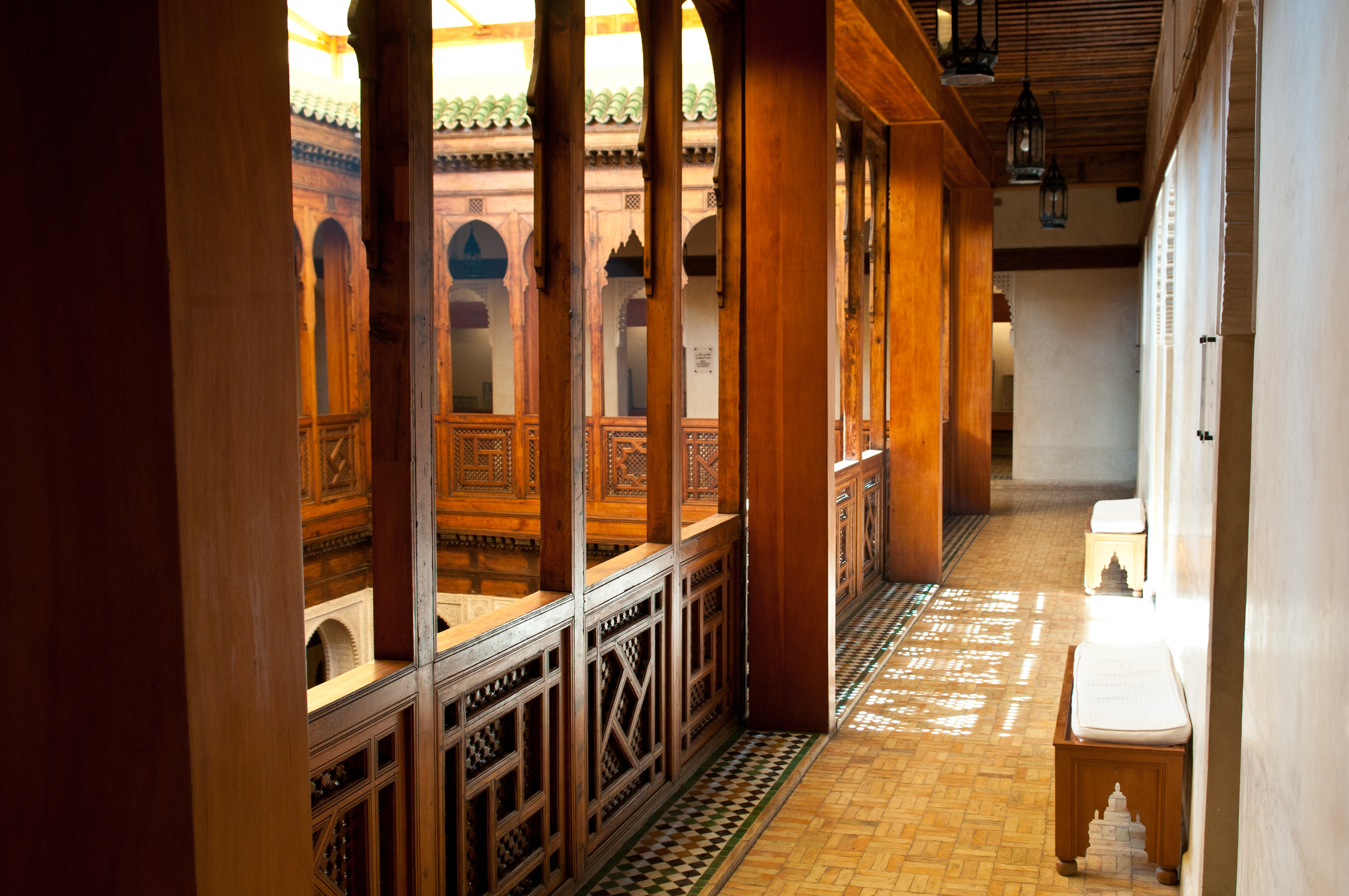
Gallery around the third (top) floor

=== The fountain ===
A saqayya is often constructed as a charitable structure, either on its own or attached to public buildings such as mosques, so as to provide locals and travelers with drinking water (similar to a sabil in other parts of the Islamic world). It constitutes an integral part of the complex around this funduq. The saqayya is placed in front of the building, facing the square. Its highly-decorated façade includes a geometric composition of zellij (mosaic tilework) framed by a blind arch of carved stucco. The façade is bordered by two engaged columns and consoles that support an overhanging canopy of carved wood.

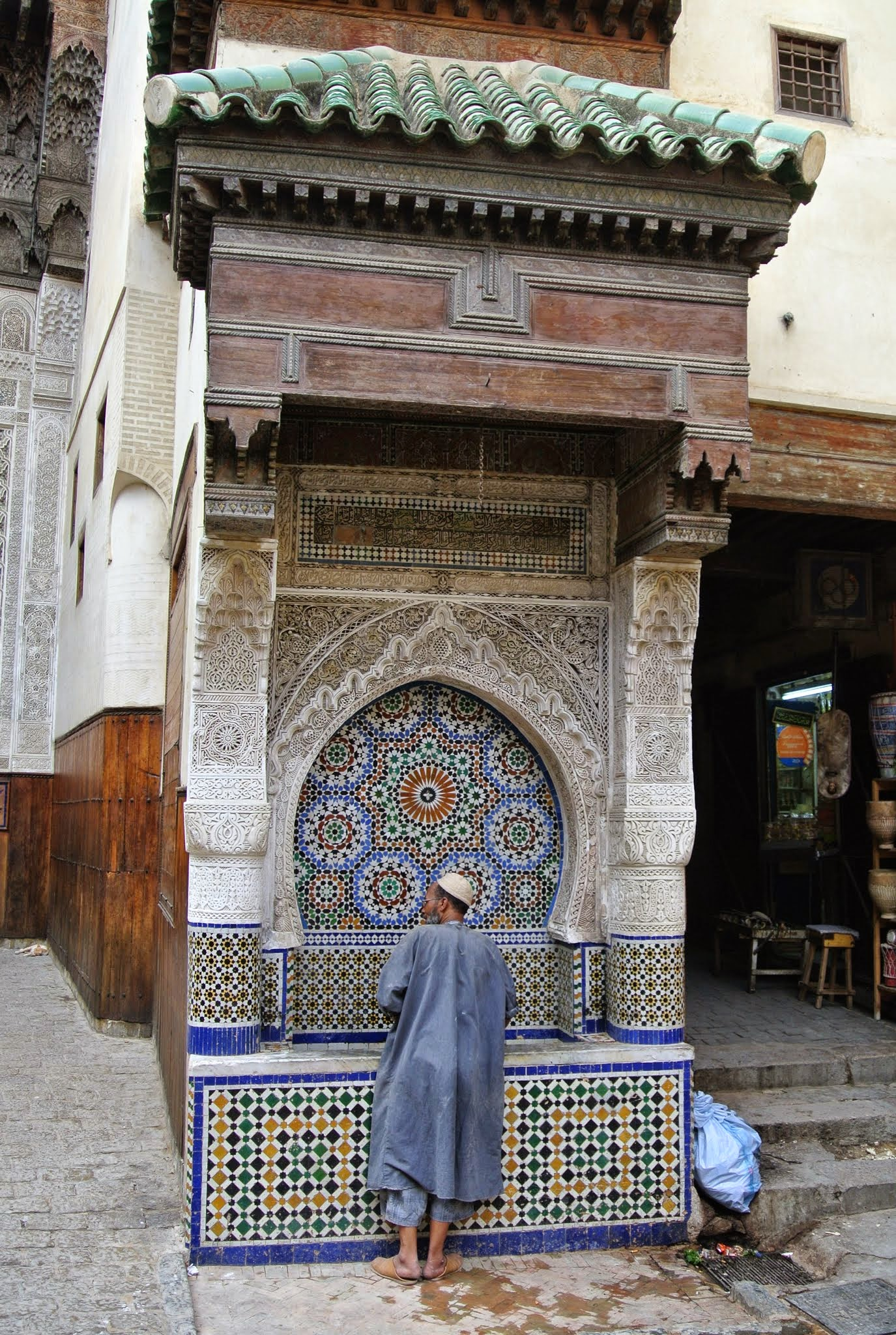
View of the fountain

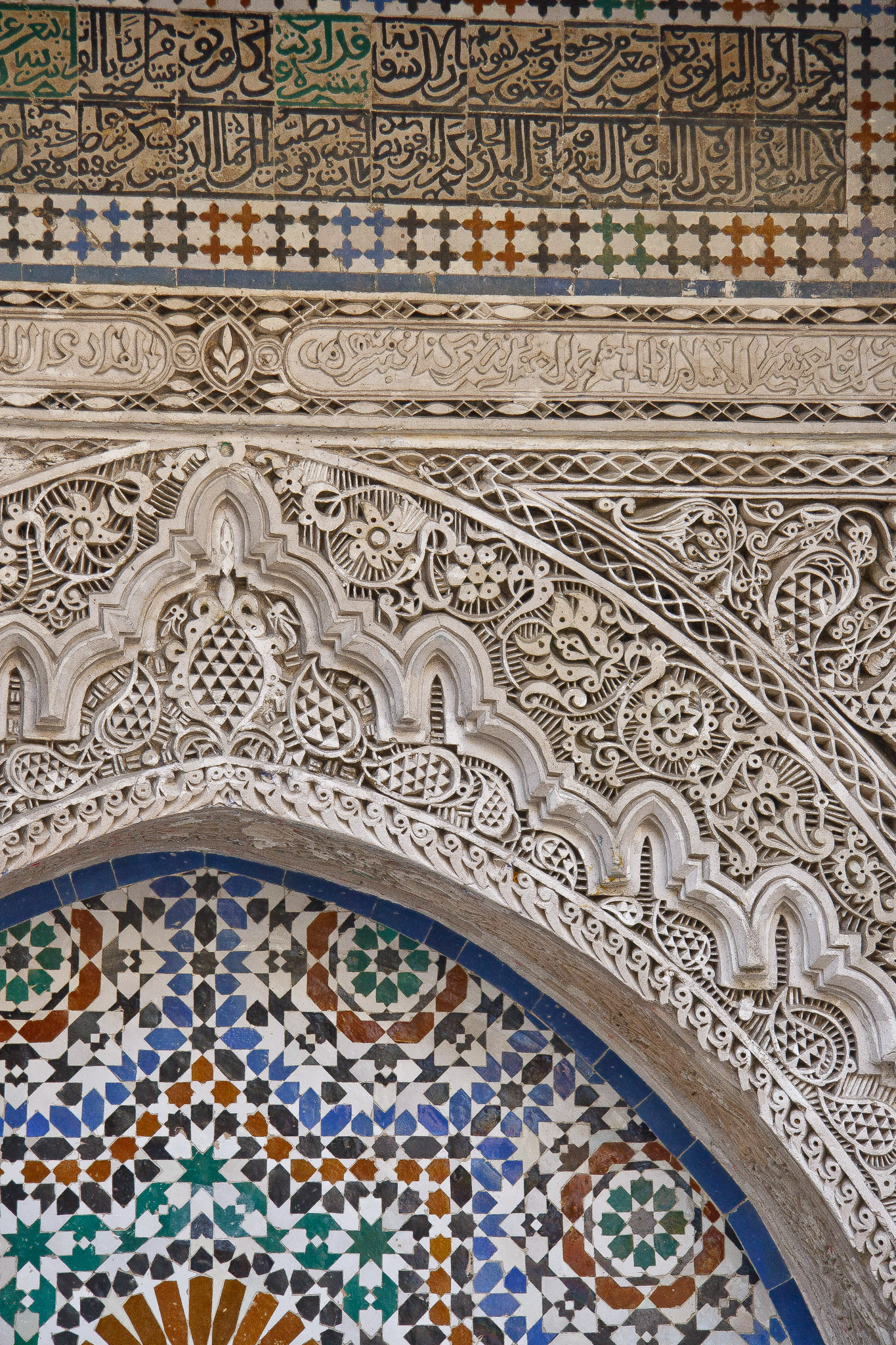
Details of the fountain's decoration

== Museum collection ==
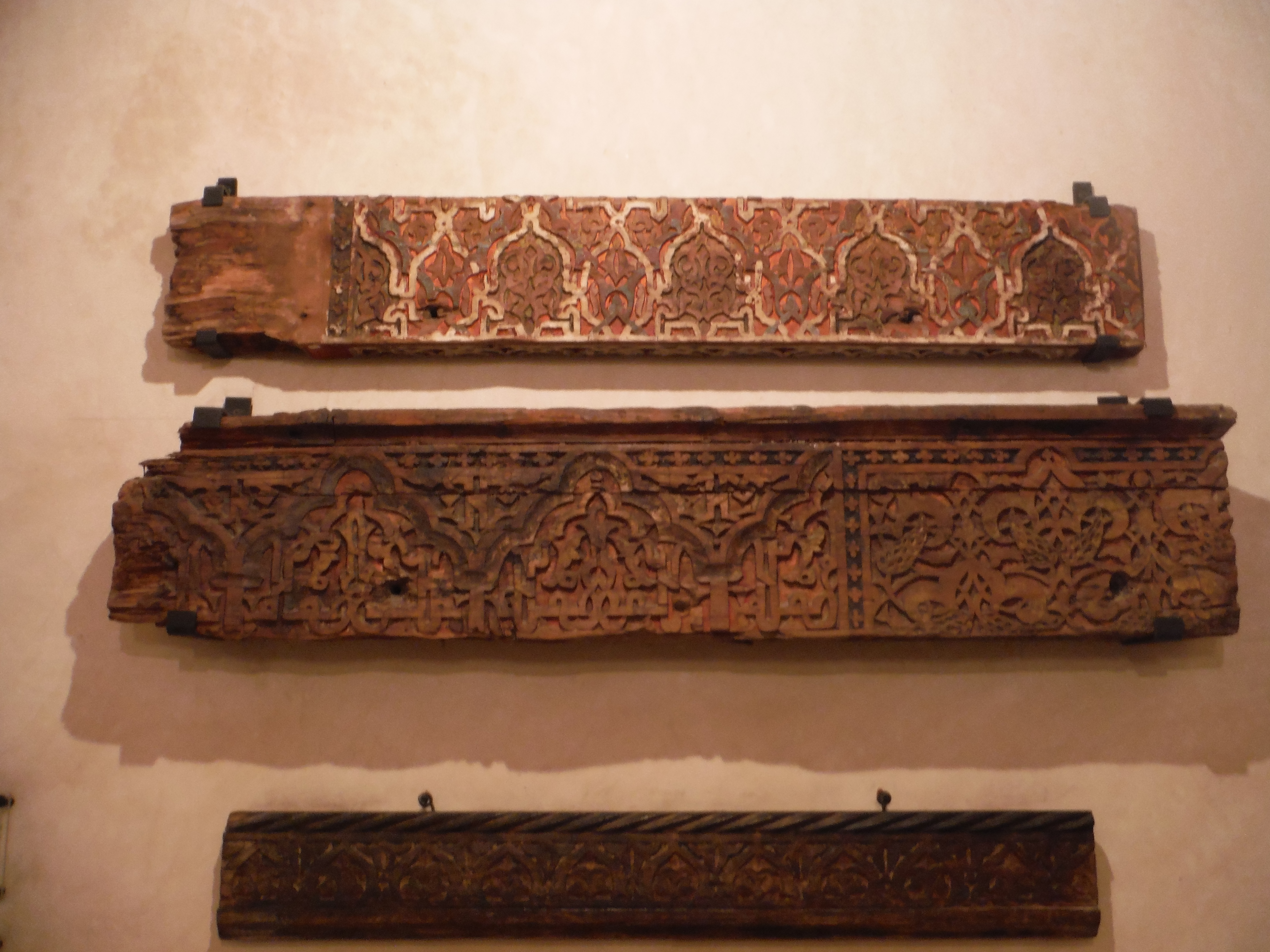
Pieces of woodwork on display in the museum today

The museum's collection of historic woodwork objects originates from across Morocco. It includes doors, musical instruments, and religious objects. Some were crafted in the more Andalusi-influenced style of Fez and others exemplify traditional Amazigh styles. One group of objects comprises wooden boards that were carved by students learning to recite the Qur'an. A large metal scale on display in the courtyard is the original scale that was once used to measure the weight of traded goods.

== Bibliography ==
- Hillenbrand, Robert. Islamic Architecture. NY: Columbia UP, 1994. 240–251.
- Pickens et al. Maroc: Les Cites Imperiales. Paris: ACR Edition. 1995.
