= Moroccan rugs =

Traditional hand-woven textiles of Morocco

Moroccan rugs are the weaves, carpets, and textiles that have been traditionally hand-woven in Morocco. Rugs have been woven by the indigenous people of Morocco since the Paleolithic Era. Twentieth-century Moroccan rugs are widely collected in the West, and are almost always woven by tribes people who do not seek nor possess formal artistic training.

== History ==
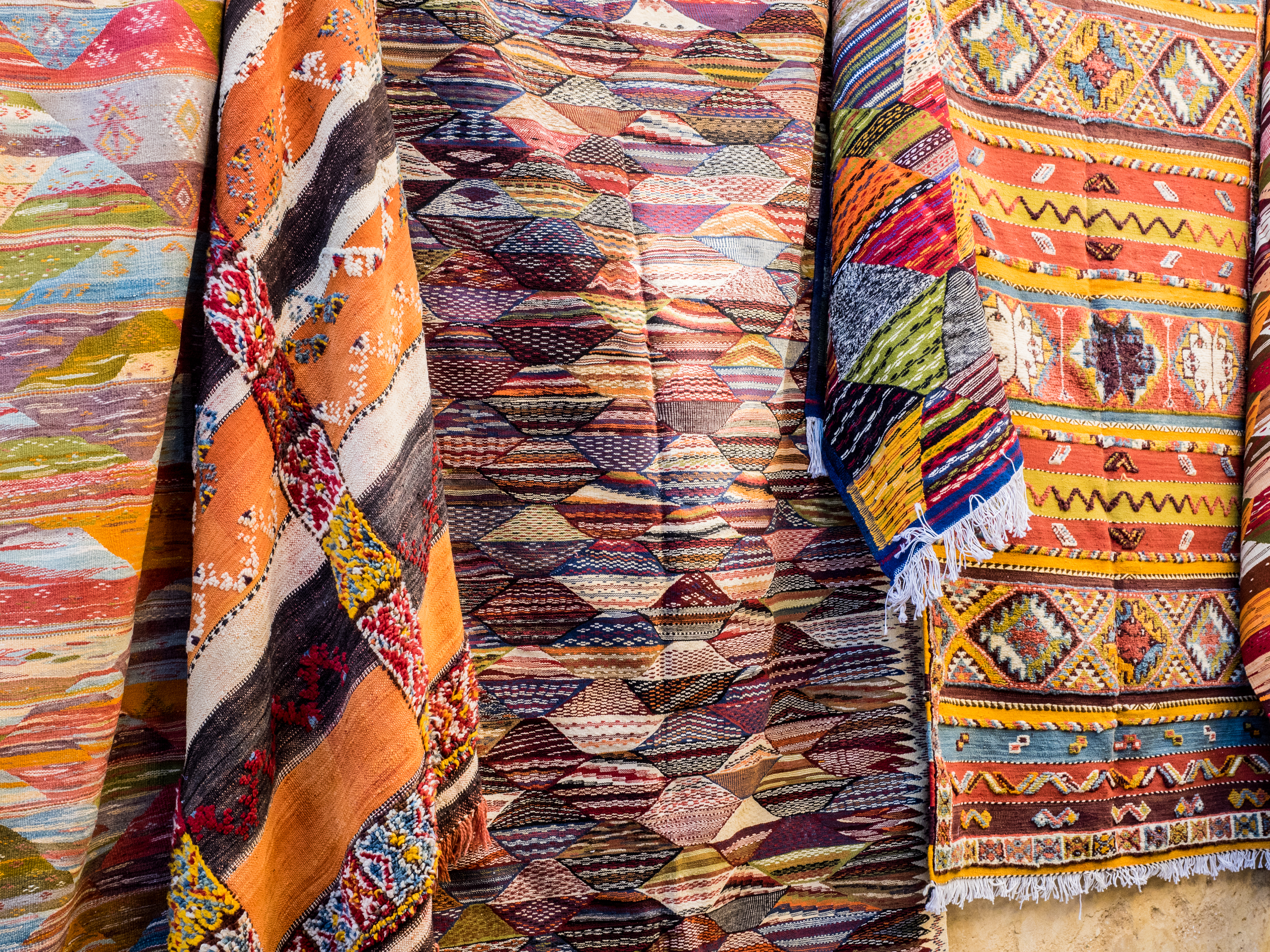
Rugs displayed at the streets of Fez Souks - Morocco

In the historic area encompassing the modern nation of Morocco, the tradition of rug-making is just about as old as it is anywhere in the world. The early adoption of rug-making by native Moroccans is certainly due in large part to the distinctive climate of the region. The designs that most frequently appear in Moroccan rugs are traditional and ancient, passed down from weaver to weaver.

Elsewhere in Morocco, most major cities have a unique style or design characteristic that distinguishes their carpets. Perhaps the most important carpet-producing city in Morocco is Fes. The city reached its golden age during the Marinid Dynasty of the thirteenth century. At that point, the city was home to over one hundred dye workers and thousands of artisan embroidery studios located in the city's medina. The coastal capital, Rabat, is famous for carpets woven with floral and diamond-shaped elements, Turkish motifs and a fairly bare field.

Moroccan rugs experienced a growth in popularity in the West with mid-century modern designers, such as Le Corbusier, who paired the thick piled Berber rugs with their sleekly designed furniture. Many of these Berber carpets are woven by the Beni Ourain peoples from the Rif Mountains near Taza. Colours vary from neutral shades to popping hues, with designs ranging from ordered geometric shapes to a more free-form, expressive pattern. Part of the appeal to the modernists was the primitivism in the carpets. Unlike the traditional antique Oriental rugs found in Western interior decoration, there is little elegance about these rugs, yet they fit wonderfully with modernist décor. Vintage and antique Moroccan rugs are fairly popular today for their decorative flexibility and reasonable prices compared to other styles of antique rugs.

== Additional reading ==
- Sovereign Carpets: Unknown Masterpieces from European Collections By E. Concaro, A. Levi
- Berber Carpets of Morocco. The Symbols. Origin and Meaning By Bruno Barbatti
- Ait Bou Ichaouen: Weavings of a Nomadic Berber Tribe Alfred H. Saulniers, Suzanne S. Saulniers
- New York Times: From Rags To Richesse
