= Bahia Palace =

Palace in Marrakesh, Morocco

- قصر الباهية
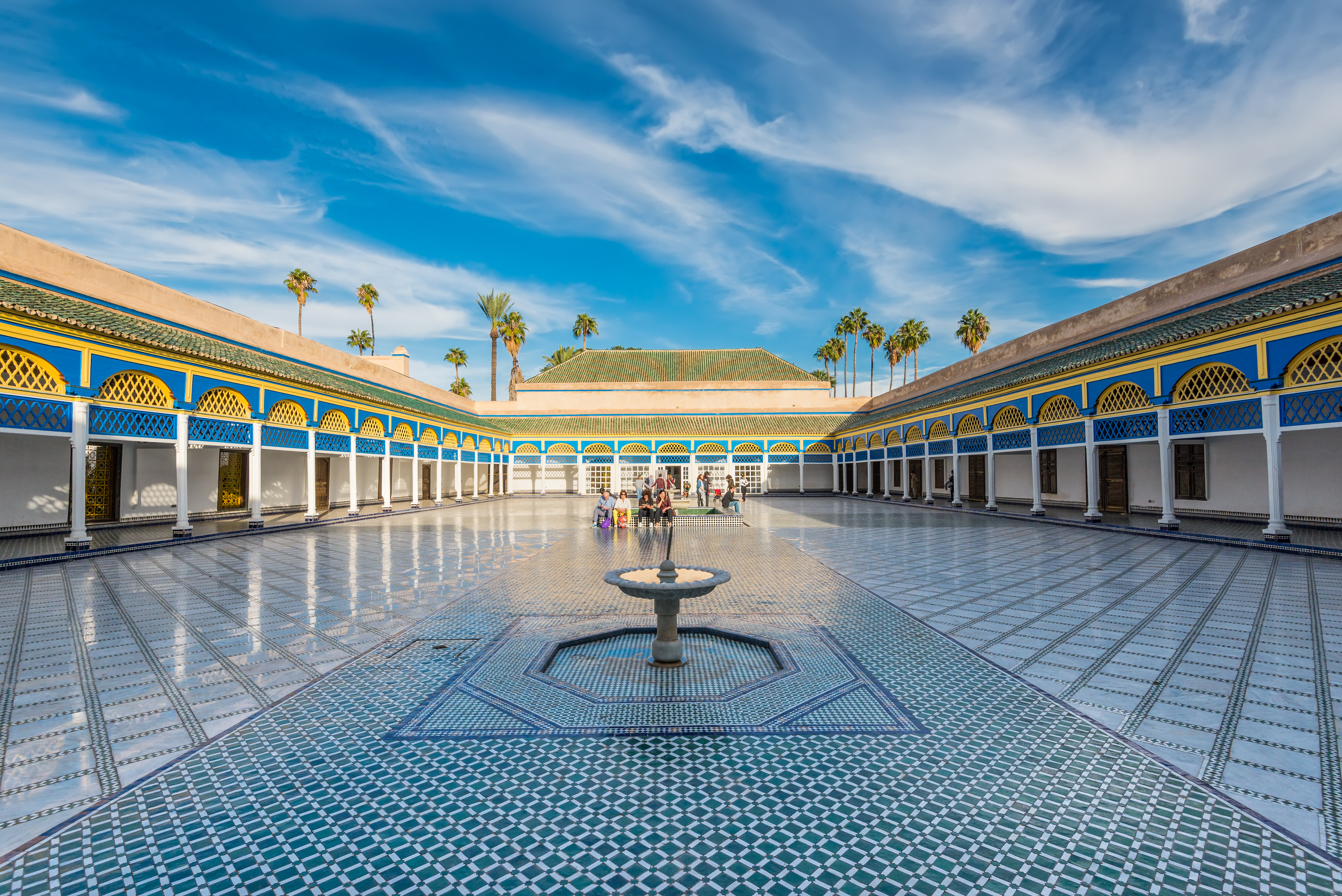
- The Grand Courtyard of the Bahia Palace
- Interactive map of the Bahia Palace area

General information
- Type: Palace
- Architectural style: Moorish (Alawi)
- Location: Marrakesh, Morocco
- Coordinates: 31°37′17.73″N 7°58′56.03″W
- Construction started: 1860s
- Completed: 1900

Design and construction
- Architect: Muhammad ibn Makki al-Misfiwi

The Bahia Palace (Arabic: قصر الباهية) is a mid to late 19th-century palace in Marrakesh, Morocco. The palace was first begun by Si Musa, grand vizier under the Alawi sultan Muhammad ibn Abd al-Rahman, in the 1860s. It was expanded by his son Si Ba Ahmed ibn Musa, grand vizier of Sultan Moulay Abdelaziz, between 1894 and 1900. Today it is a well-known historic monument and tourist attraction in the city.

The palace has an irregular layout comprising around 150 rooms organized around multiple internal courtyards and riad gardens. It is most notable for its decoration, particularly its painted wood ceilings, along with sculpted stucco and zellij tilework. The original grounds of the palace also encompassed a wider area with gardens, parks, stables, a mosque, and other annexes.

== History ==
=== First construction ===
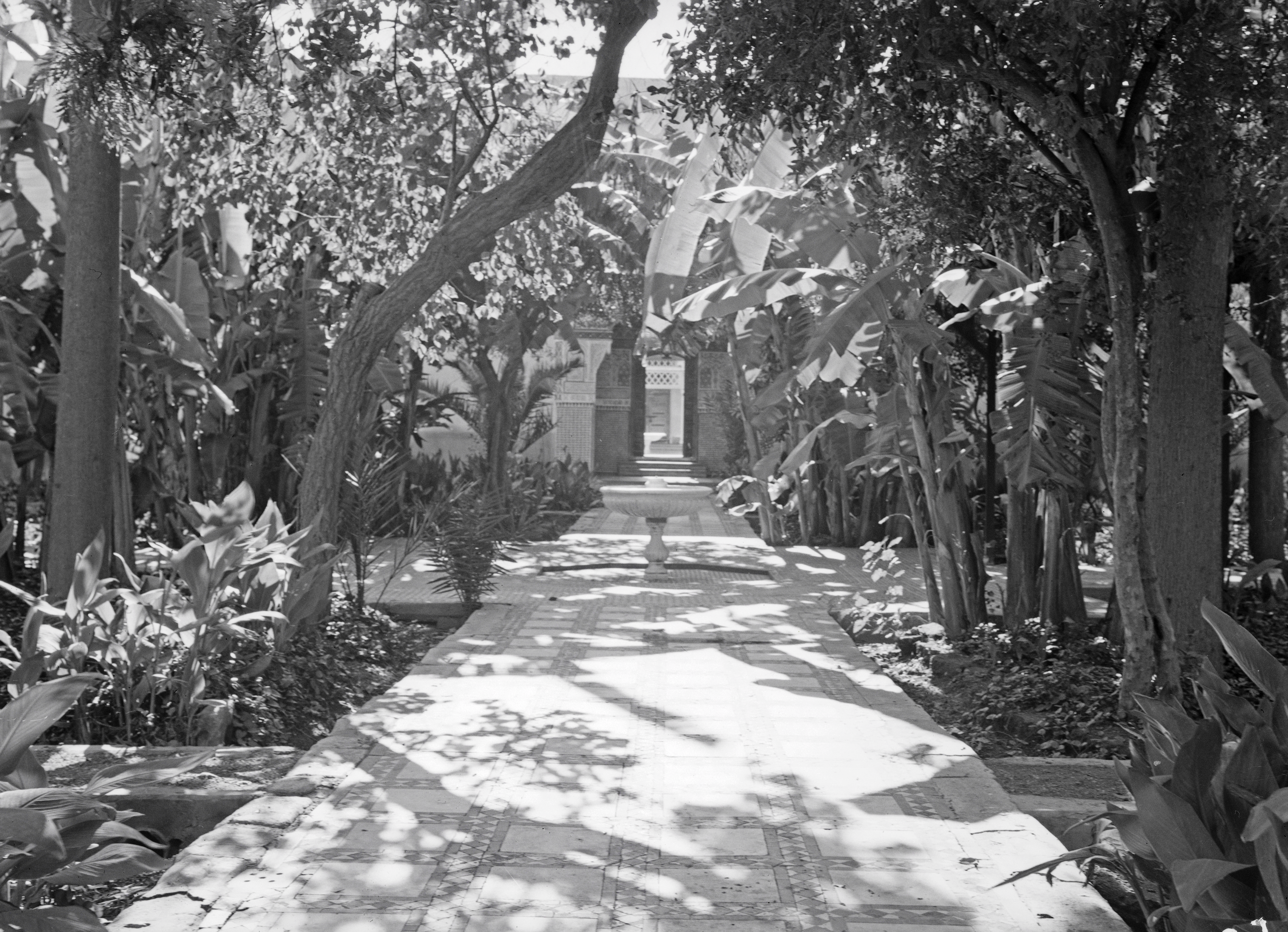
The Grand Riad of the palace (built by Si Musa), photographed in 1930–1.

Si Musa was descended from a family of black slaves which served the Moroccan makhzen (royal government) and reached the highest offices in the country. He was first hajib (similar to a chamberlain) then grand vizier under Muhammad ibn Abd al-Rahman, who reigned from 1859 to 1873. Construction of the palace took place in the 1860s.

Among the existing parts of the palace today, the "Grand Riad" or large riad garden and its adjoining rooms in the northern part of the palace date from Si Musa's time and are also consequently known as the Dar Si Moussa. The two chambers on the east and west sides of the garden contain an inscription which dates their construction to 1866–7.

=== Expansion by Ba Ahmed ===
Ahmad ibn Musa, known also as Ba Ahmed, was hajib to Sultan Moulay Hassan and, upon the latter's death, ensured his son Abdelaziz's accession to the throne in 1894, earning him a promotion to grand vizier. As Abdelaziz was only sixteen, Ba Ahmed became the effective ruler of Morocco until his own death from disease in 1900. During his tenure, he was also supported by his two brothers, Si Sa'id and Idris (who died with him in 1900).

He progressively expanded his father's palace throughout these years as grand vizier (1894–1900), adding to it piece by piece as new land became available for purchase. His brother Si Sa'id built his own palace north of here during this time, the Dar Si Said, which today serves as a museum.

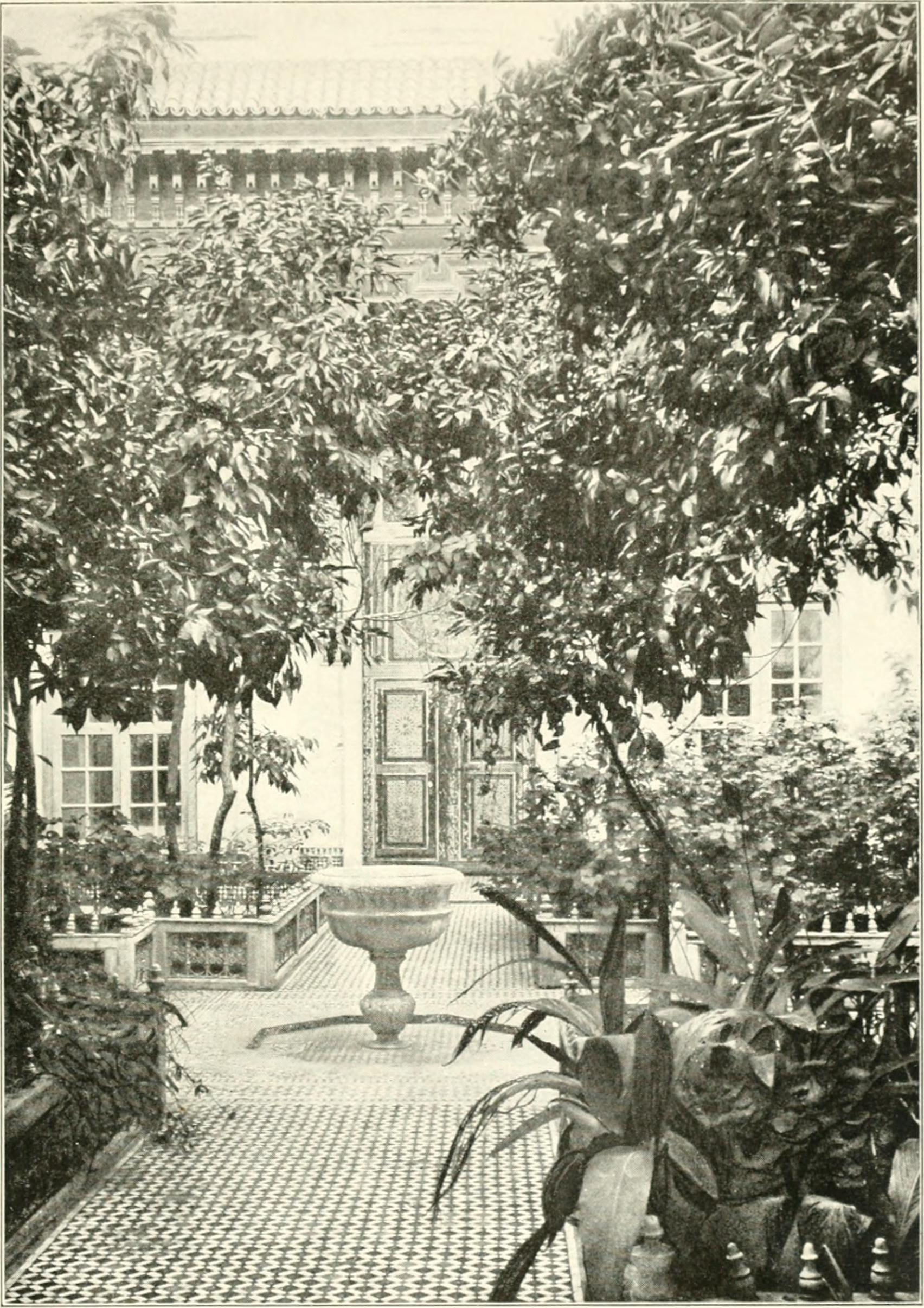
The Small Riad, photographed in 1920

Ba Ahmed was responsible for constructing most of the Bahia Palace's southern parts, which include various smaller courtyards and riad gardens. The marble-paved Grand Courtyard, one of the largest spaces in the palace today, is dated to 1896–7, during Ba Ahmed's tenure. On the east side of this palace complex, he created a vast private park and garden, complete with a central water basin. It could be accessed from the palace via a bridge over the adjacent street. The architect was a man named Muhammad ibn Makki al-Misfiwi, originally from Safi, who was born in 1857 and died in 1926. The palace's growth overtook much of the previously existing neighbourhood north of the Mellah and resulted in major changes in the local street layout. The growing palace housed Ba Ahmed's servants (including his own slaves) and his harem (private family residence). The name al-Bahia (Arabic: الباهية), meaning "the Brilliant", was reportedly the name of his favourite wife. The entire palace was built on one level, possibly as Ba Ahmed's own physique (which was described as stout and obese) made it more difficult for him to go up and down stairs.

=== 20th century to present day ===
After Ba Ahmed's death in 1900, his palace became royal property. Mere hours after his death, Sultan Abdelaziz (who subsequently took full power over the country) reportedly ordered the palace to be looted for valuable items. In 1908, Madani el-Glaoui, brother of Thami el-Glaoui, took control of the palace and subsequently used it to entertain foreign guests. He added an upper floor for the first time to some parts of the palace.

In 1912, after the installation of the French Protectorate in Morocco, the palace was converted into the residence of the French resident-general (Lyautey) in the city. After Moroccan independence, the palace was again used as a royal residence for King Mohammed V before being transferred to the Moroccan Ministry of Culture under King Hassan II, which turned it into a tourist attraction.

Today, the palace is one of the most visited tourist attractions in Morocco; the government counted 410,141 visitors from January to April 2019, more than any other heritage site in the country. The palace is occasionally still used by the King of Morocco to receive foreign dignitaries or host events.

The palace suffered significant damages during the September 2023 earthquake that struck southern Morocco. An early assessment of damage reported, among other things, partial collapses in some of the houses and structures adjoining the palace or located on its grounds, damage to some of the roofs, fissures in some walls, and the collapse of a vaulted ceiling in the Grand Riad. The palace was subsequently closed for repairs and was reopened to visitors in October 2023.

== Architecture ==
=== Layout ===
The palace's labyrinthine layout, which does not reveal a clear unified plan, is due to the fact that it was expanded in a piecemeal fashion in different stages over many years. It comprises a number of inner courtyards and riad gardens (interior gardens with a symmetrical four-part division), around which are arranged various rooms and chambers. The main palace complex today covers almost 2 hectares and contains approximately 150 rooms.

==== Entrance area and Small Riad ====
The palace grounds are entered via a horseshoe arch doorway from the main street, beyond which a long garden path leads to the palace. A minor courtyard leads into the Small Riad (Petit Riad), a square courtyard garden divided by walkways along its two central axes and surrounded by richly decorated galleries and chambers. One of the chambers was Ba Ahmed's diwan or Council Chamber. A second floor apartment above this riad was added by Madani el-Glaoui after Ba Ahmed's death. East of the Small Riad is a small inner courtyard, known as the Small Courtyard, surrounded by decorated chambers.

Entrance of the palace

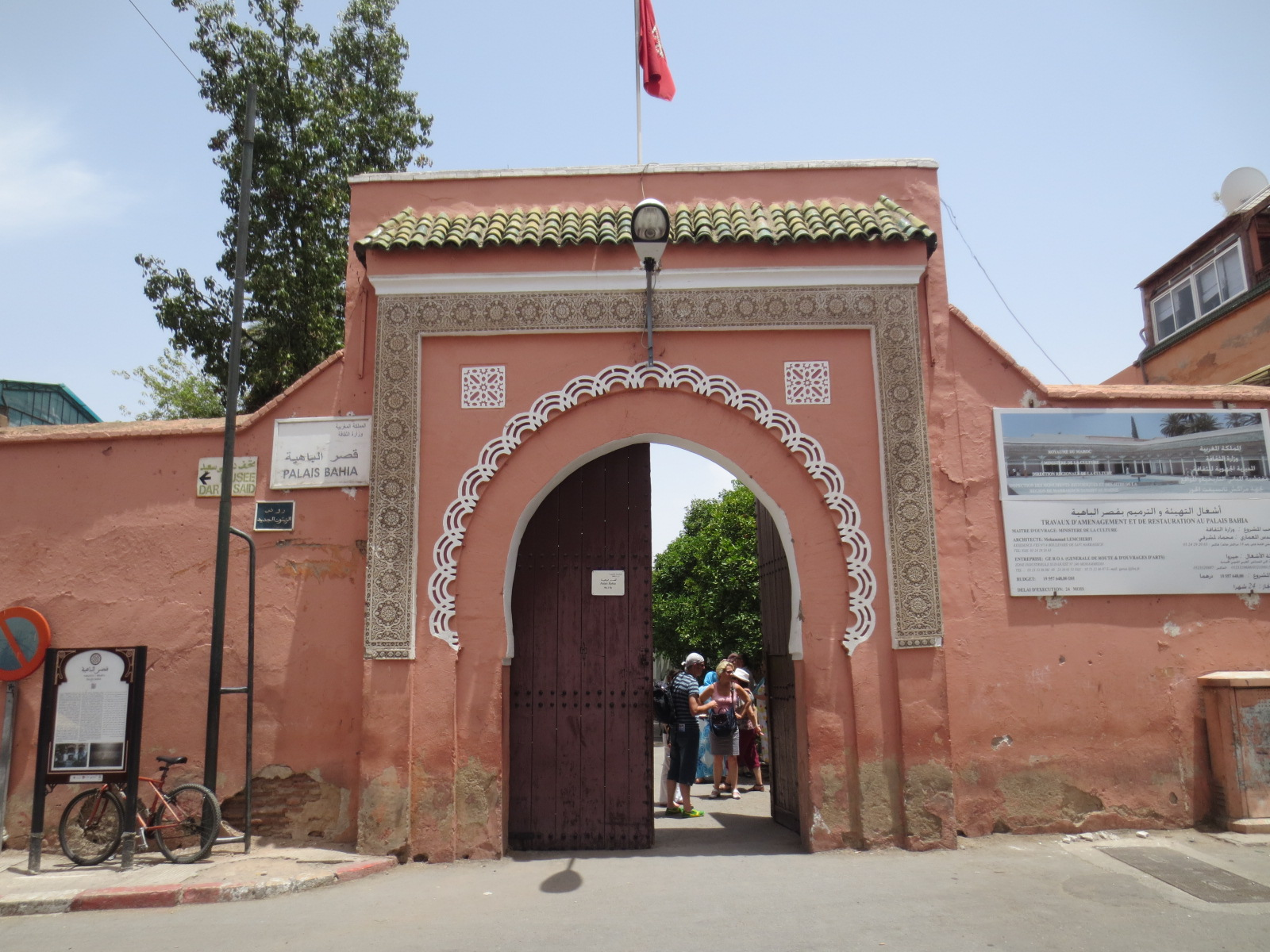
Entrance gate to the palace grounds

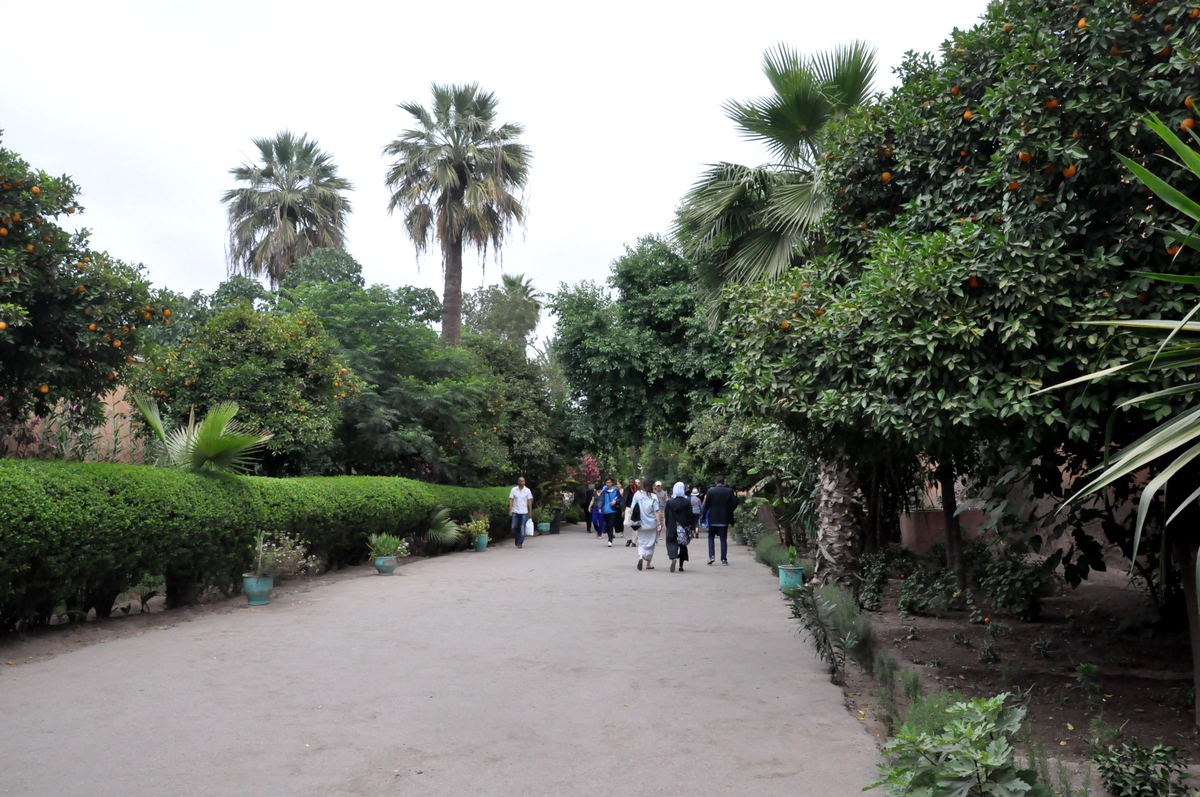
Garden path leading from the gate to the palace

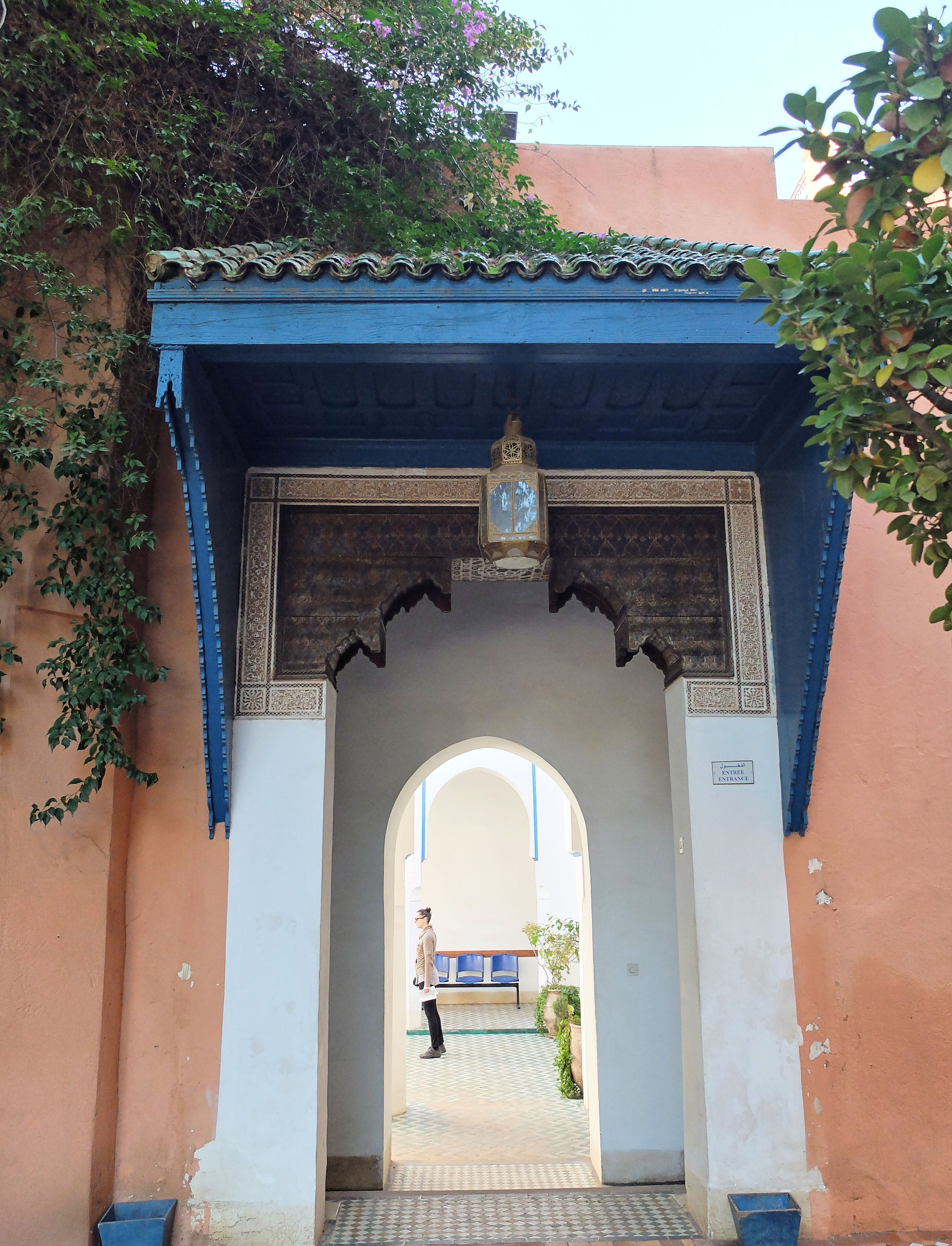
Second gateway, the entrance to the palace for visitors today

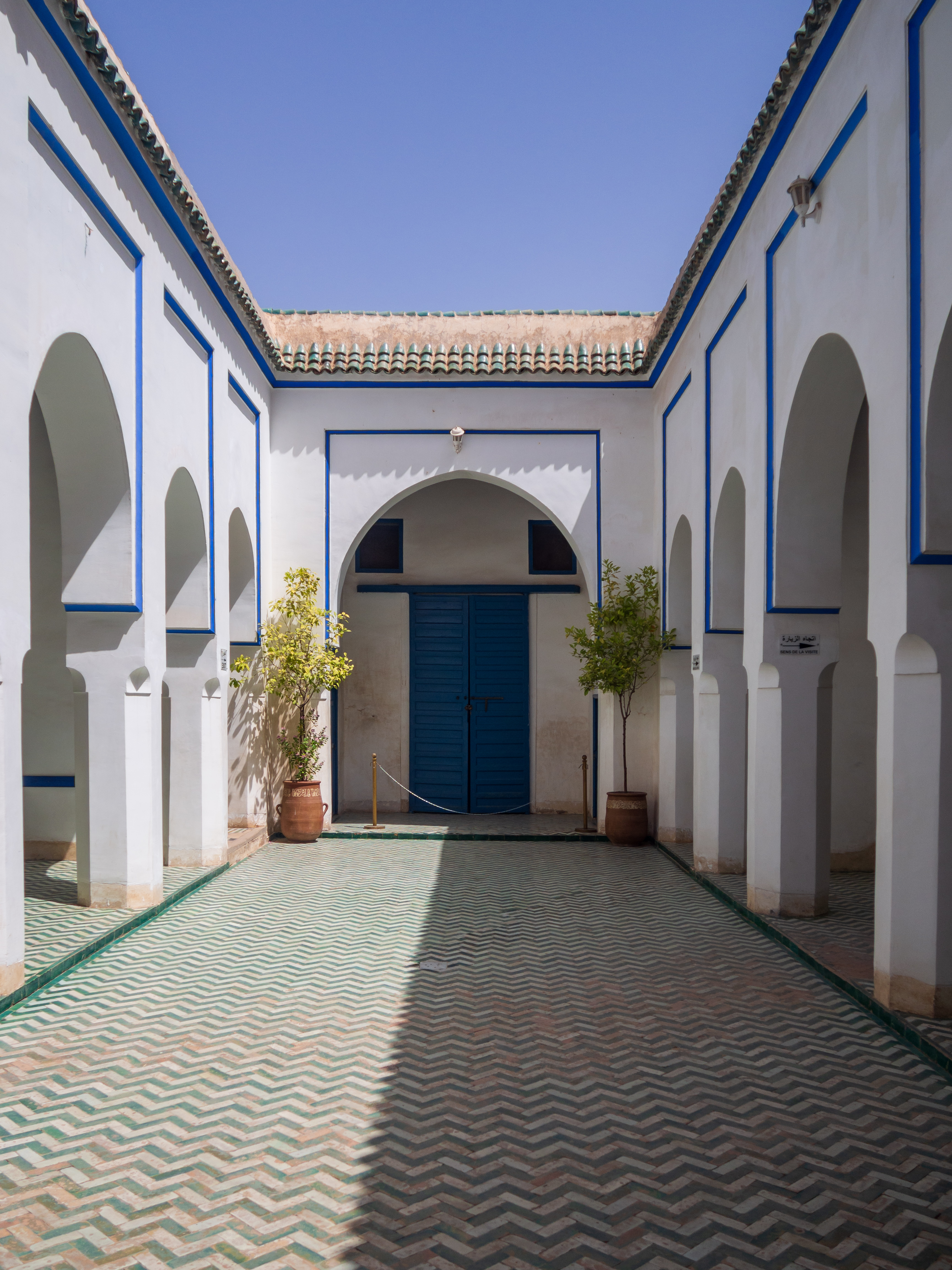
Minor courtyard following the entrance of the palace
Small Riad

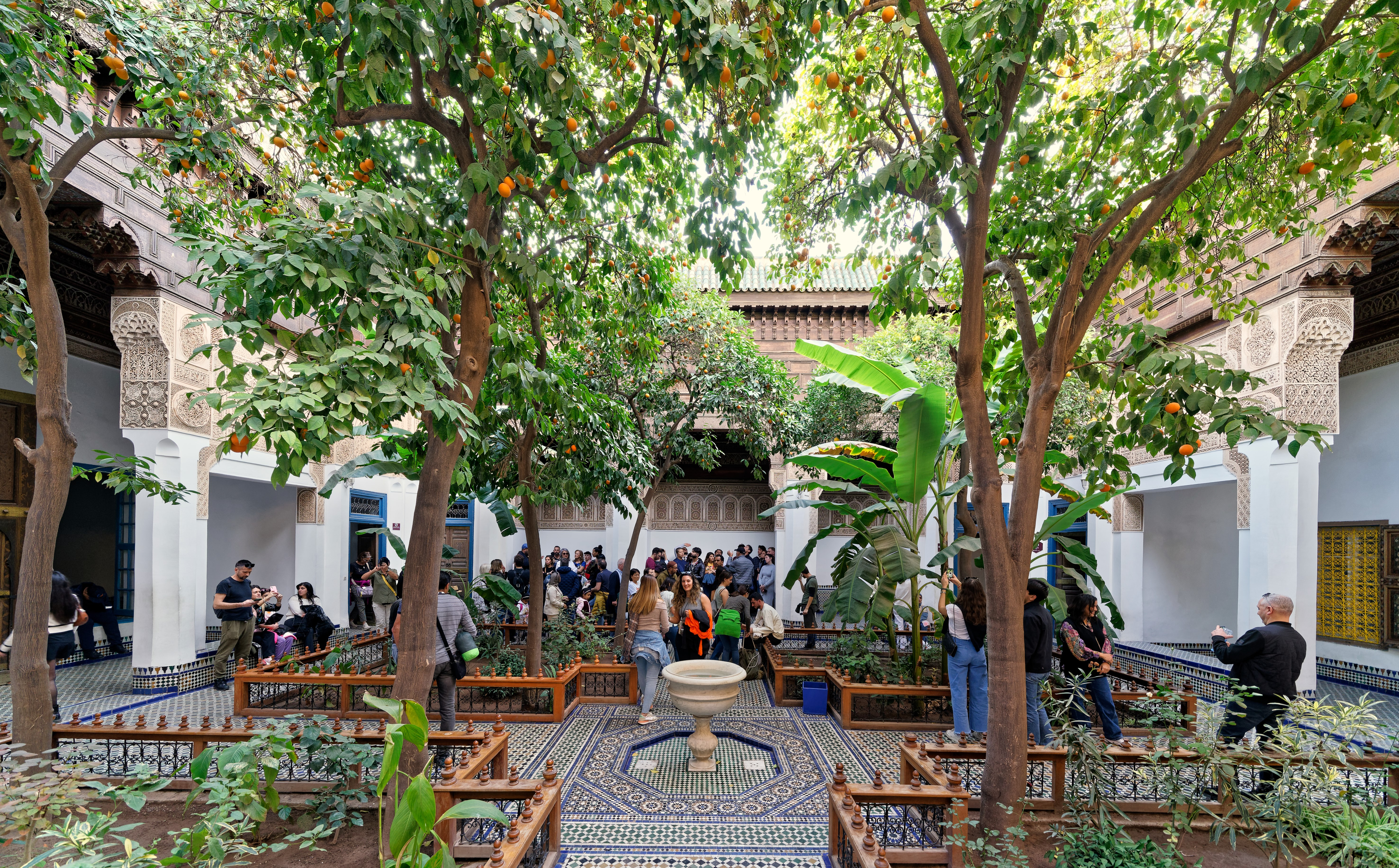
The courtyard of the Small Riad

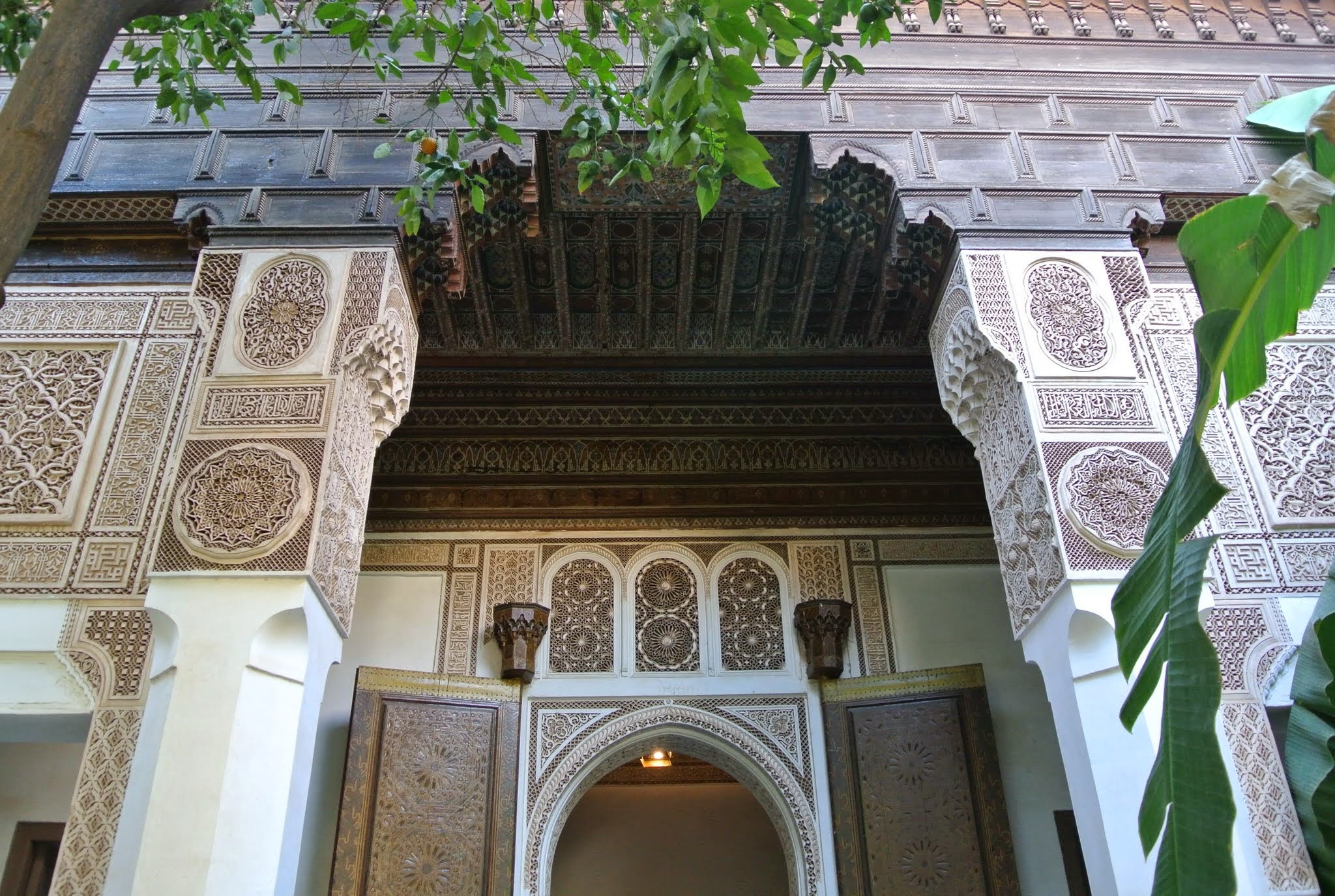
The gallery around the courtyard

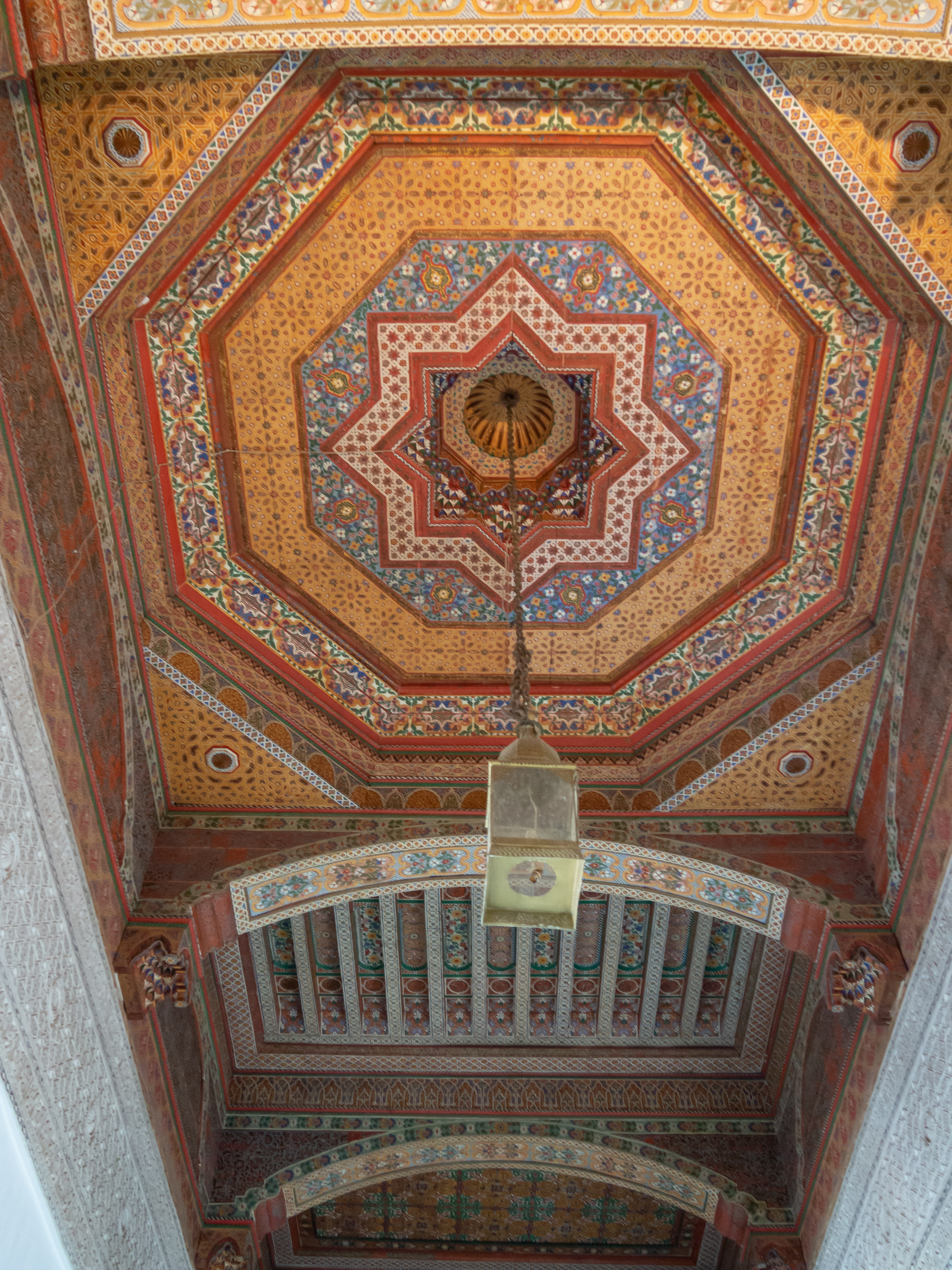
Sculpted and painted wooden ceiling in one of the rooms around the courtyard

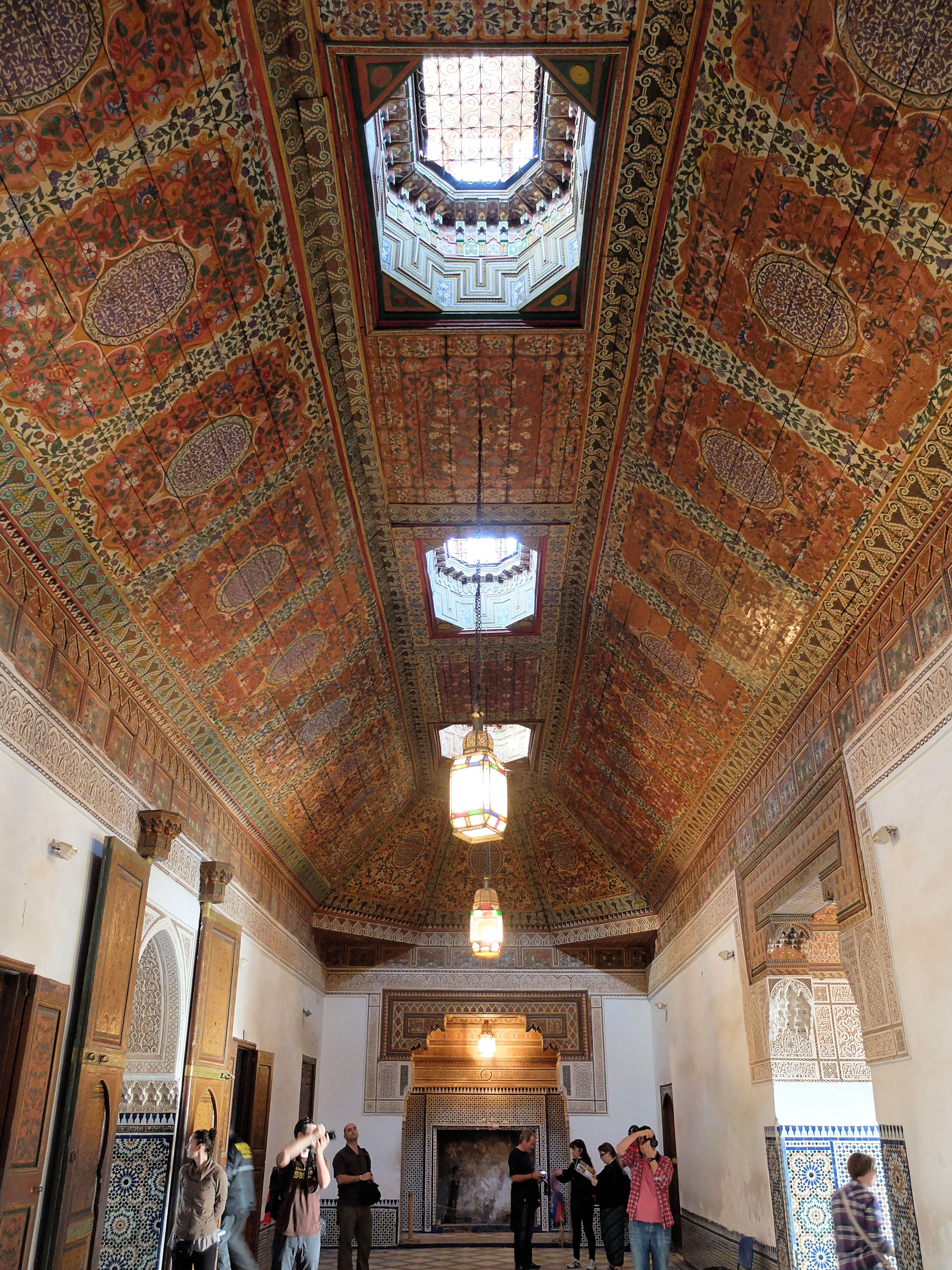
Hall or salon between the Small Riad and the Small Courtyard to the east
Small Courtyard

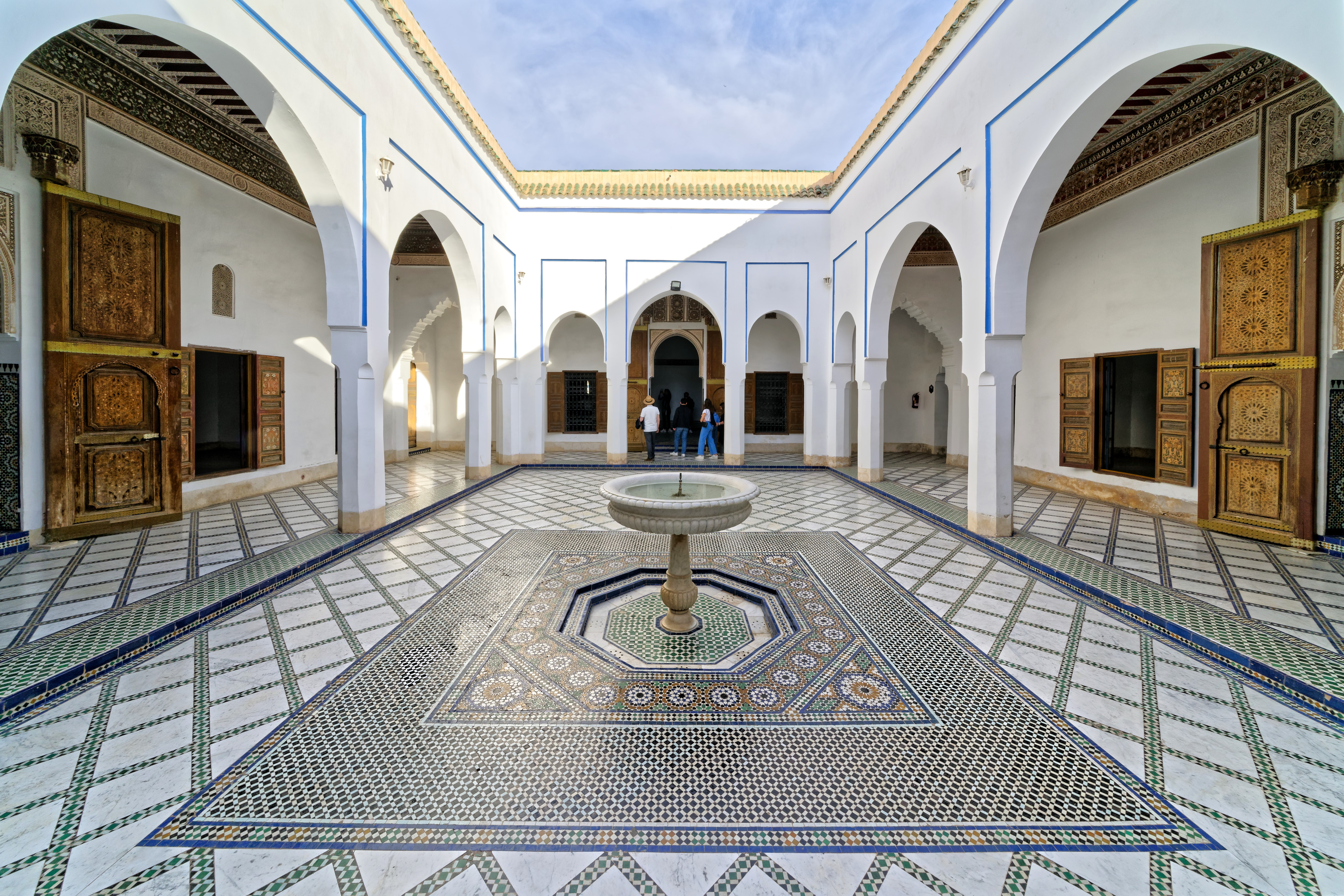
The Small Courtyard (located between the Small Riad and the Grand Courtyard)

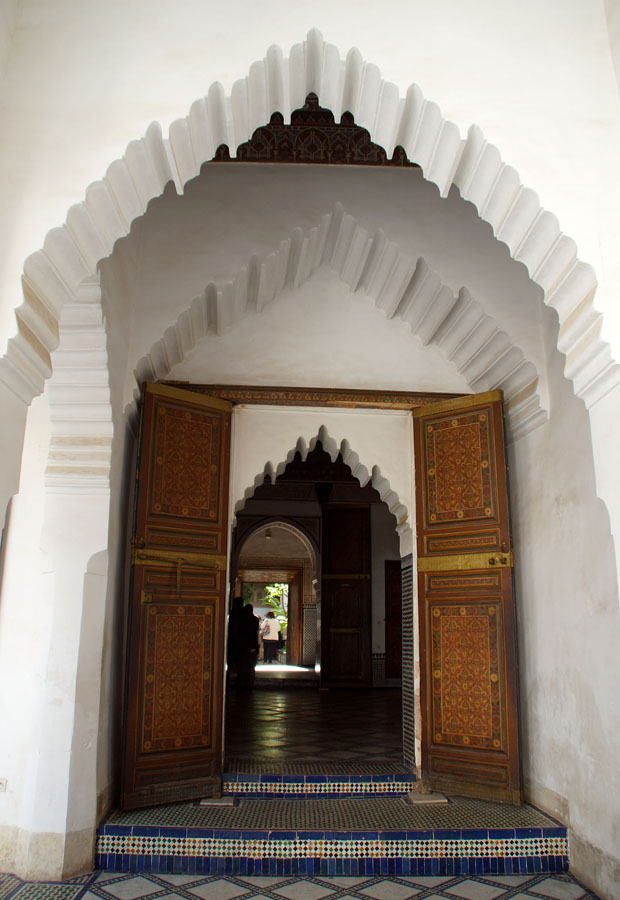
Example of lambrequin arches around the courtyard

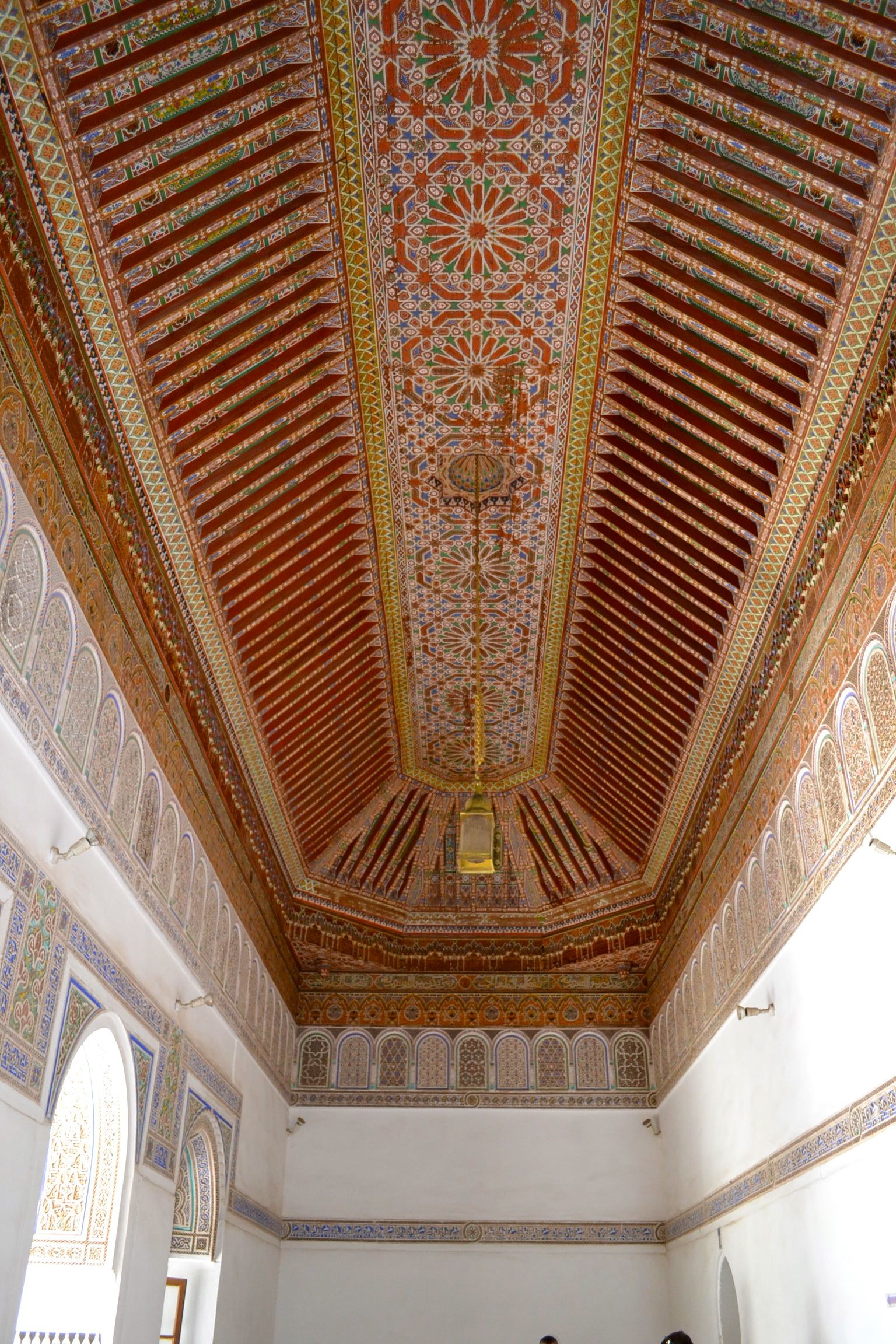
Decorated ceiling in a room around the courtyard

==== Grand Courtyard and harem ====
East of the Small Courtyard is the Grand Courtyard or Large Courtyard (also known in French as the Cour d'Honneur), the most impressive part of the palace. This part of the palace is dated to 1896–7. Measuring 50 by 30 meters, it is paved with Italian Carrara marble and surrounded by an elegant and colourful wooden gallery. These galleries give access to some 80 rooms which are believed to have been part of Ba Ahmed's harem and the residences of his concubines. At the east end of this courtyard is a grand hall (known as the Salle d'Honneur in French), measuring 20 by 8 meters and featuring a high ceiling with some of the best painted decoration in the palace. An inscription dates the construction of this chamber to 1896-1897, which was probably the last major expansion of the palace.

The Grand Courtyard

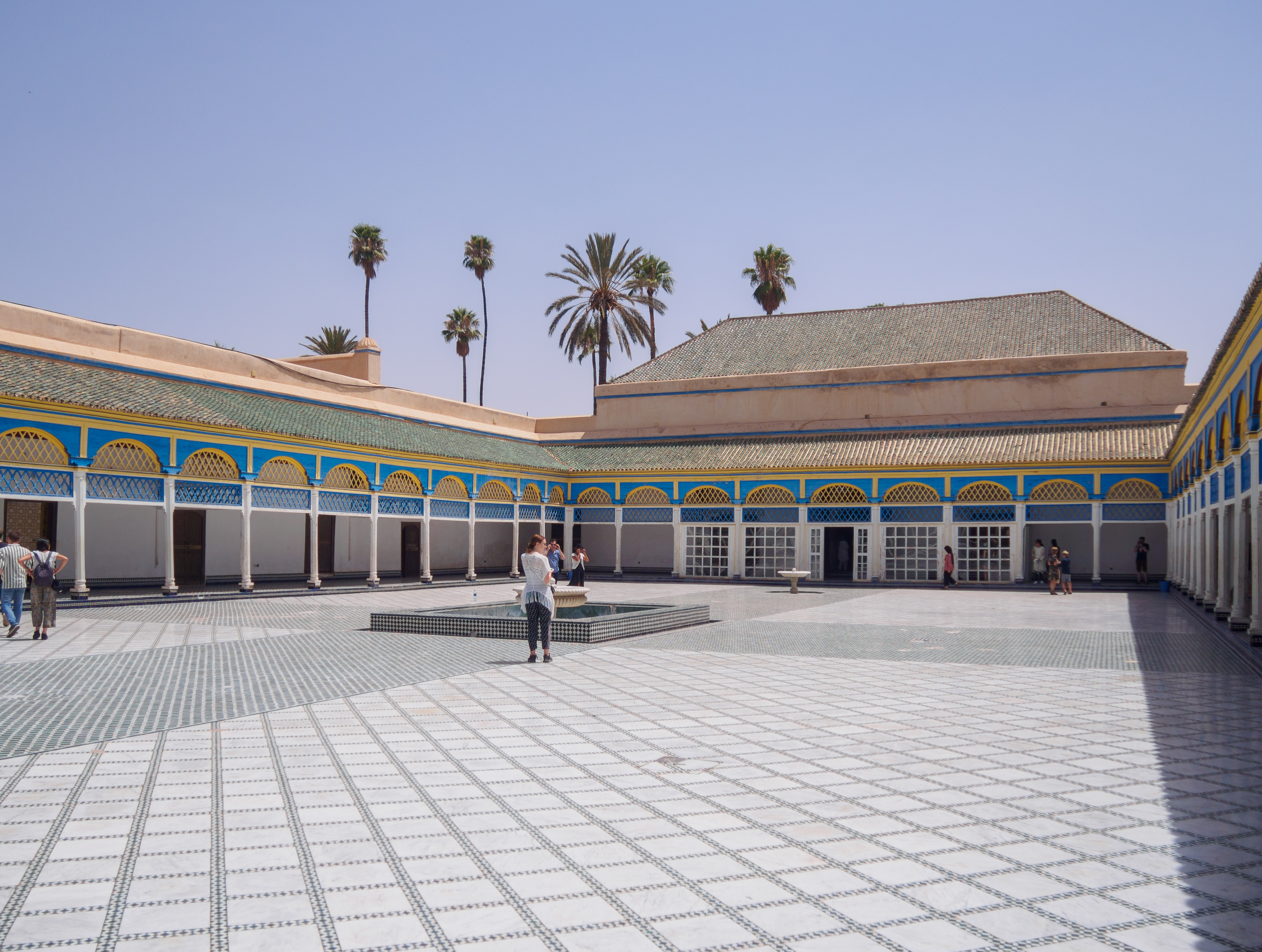
The Grand Courtyard (looking east)

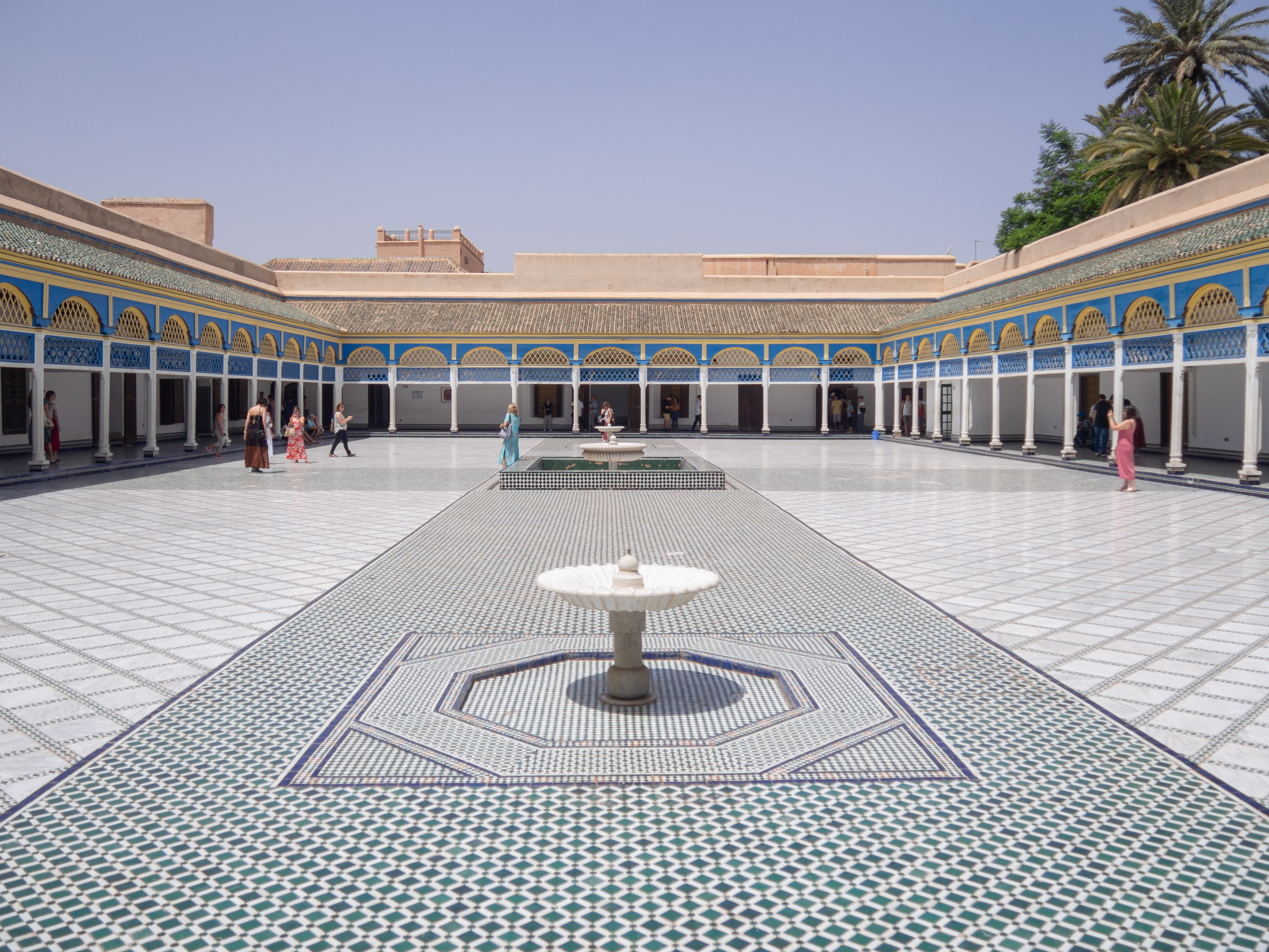
The Grand Courtyard (looking west)

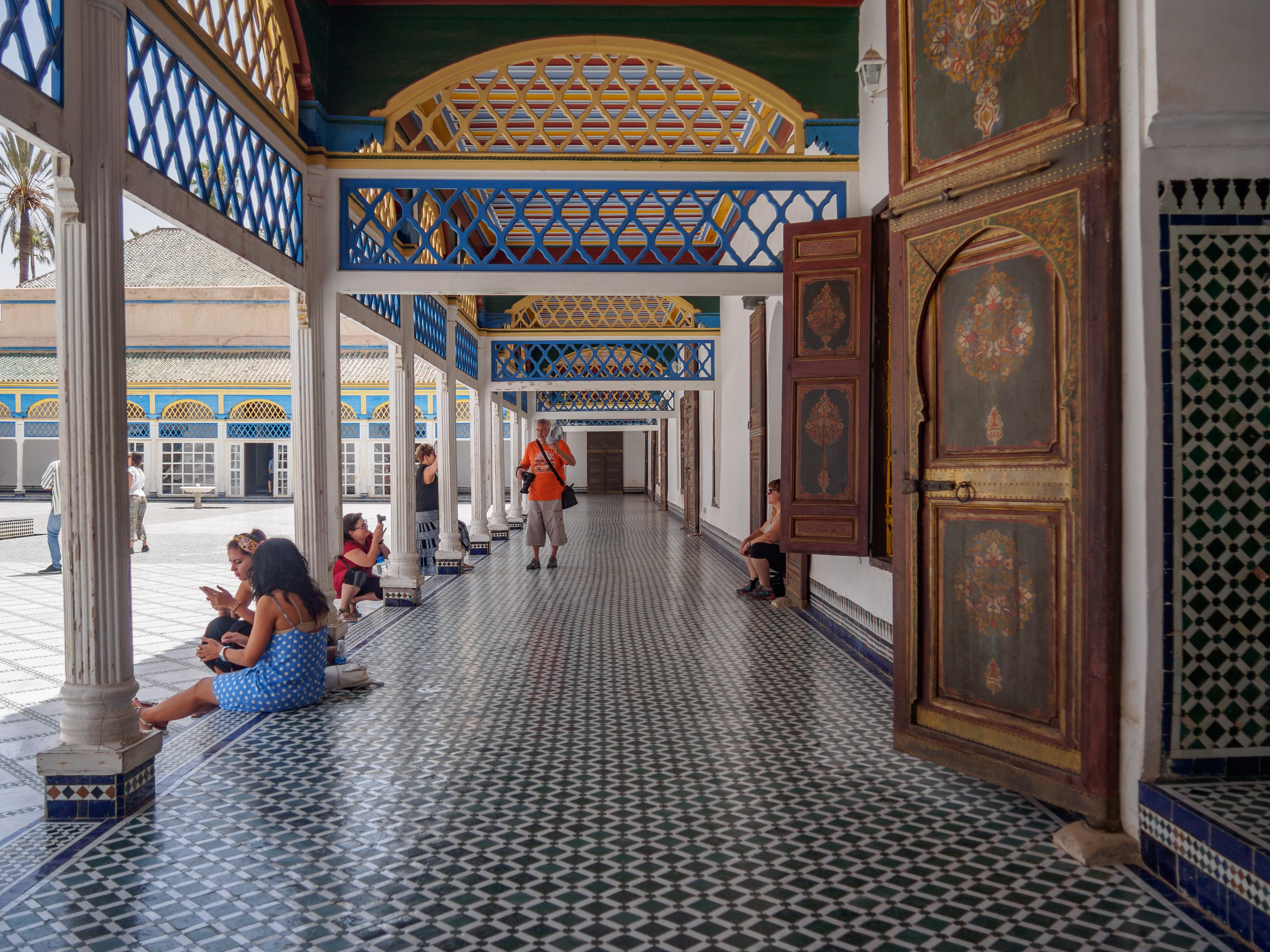
The gallery around the courtyard

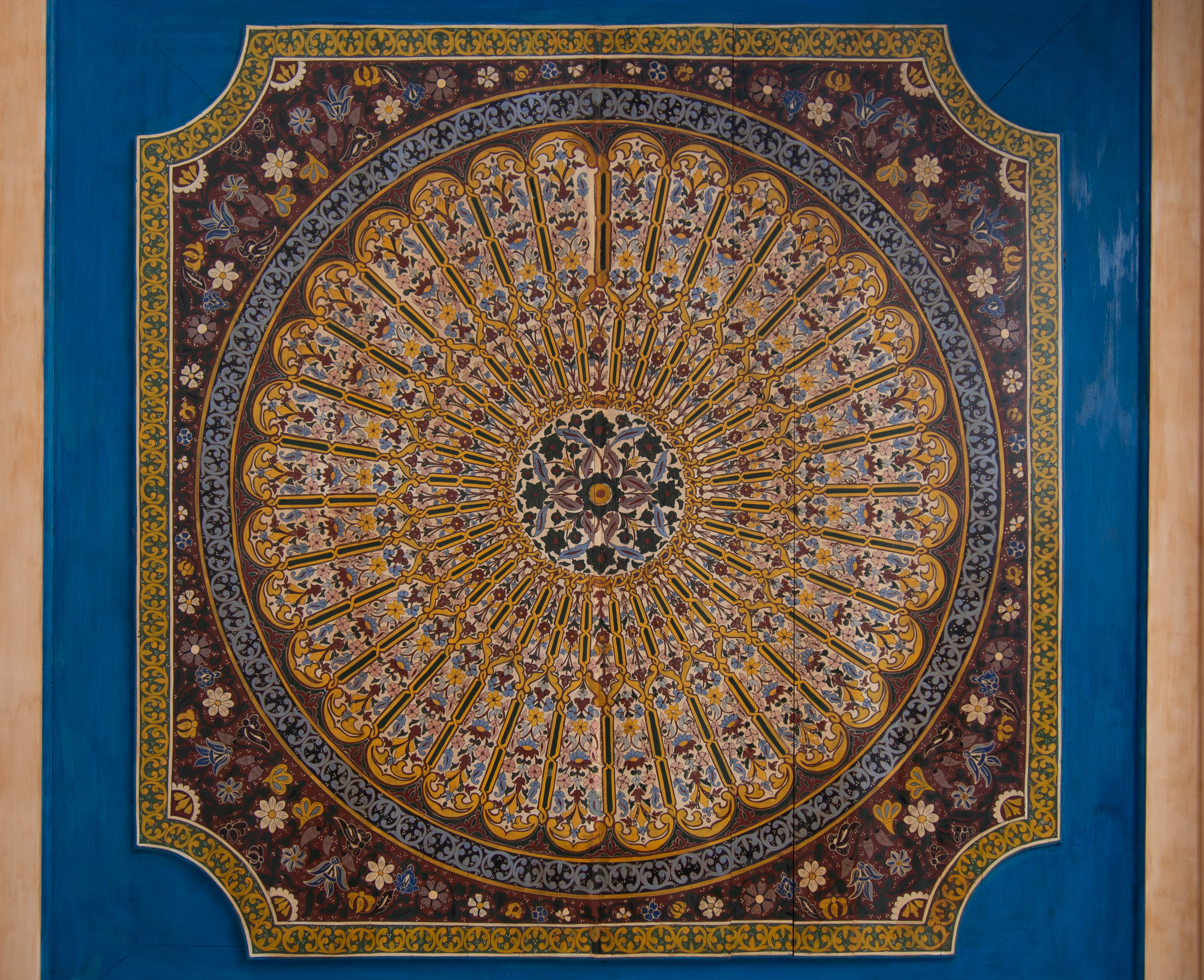
Painted ceiling under the gallery

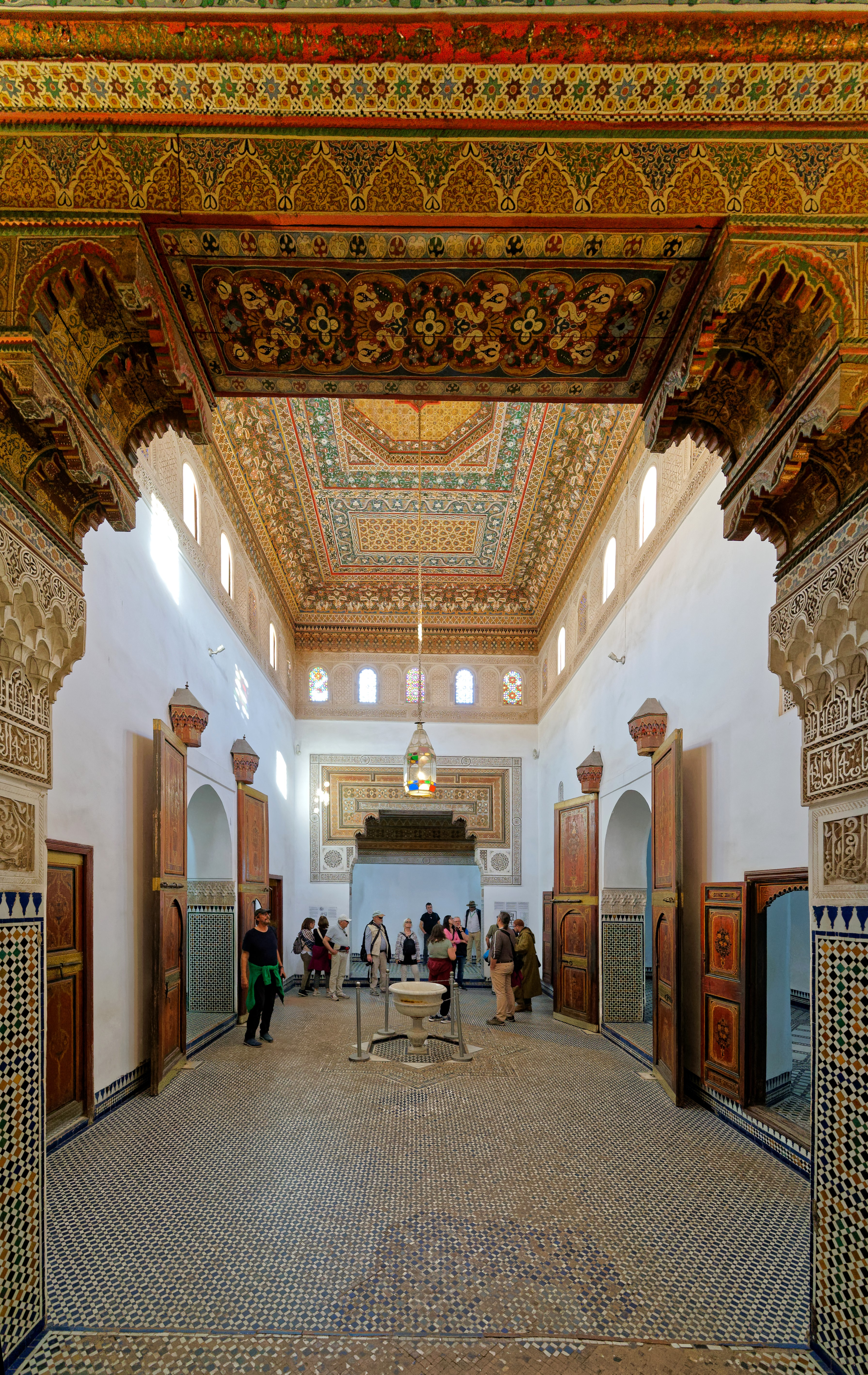
Main hall in the private apartment of Ba Ahmed's wife

West of the Grand Courtyard (more or less between the Small Courtyard to the south and the Great Riad to the north) is a private apartment built by Ba Ahmed in 1898 for his first wife, Lalla Zaynab.

==== Grand Riad ====
North of the Grand Courtyard area is another large courtyard known as the Grand Riad or Large Riad. Along with its adjoining rooms, it is the oldest part of the palace and dates from the time of Ba Ahmed's father, Si Musa. The courtyard is occupied, as its name implies, by a very large riad garden which is still planted with trees from the 19th century. The garden is flanked to the east and west by two grand halls with excellent decoration and an inscription which dates their construction to 1866-67.

The Grand Riad (Dar Si Moussa)

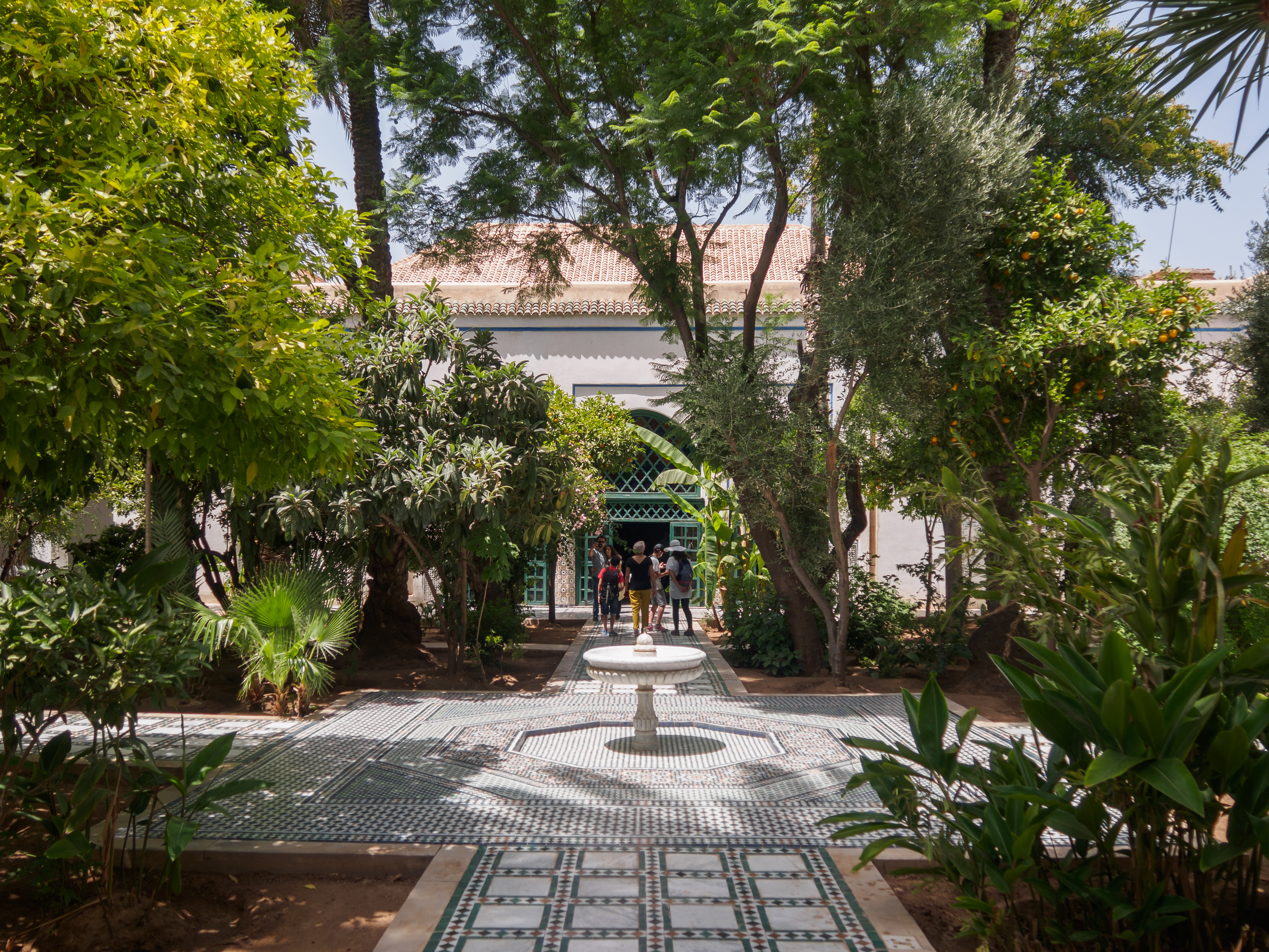
Courtyard and garden of the Grand Riad

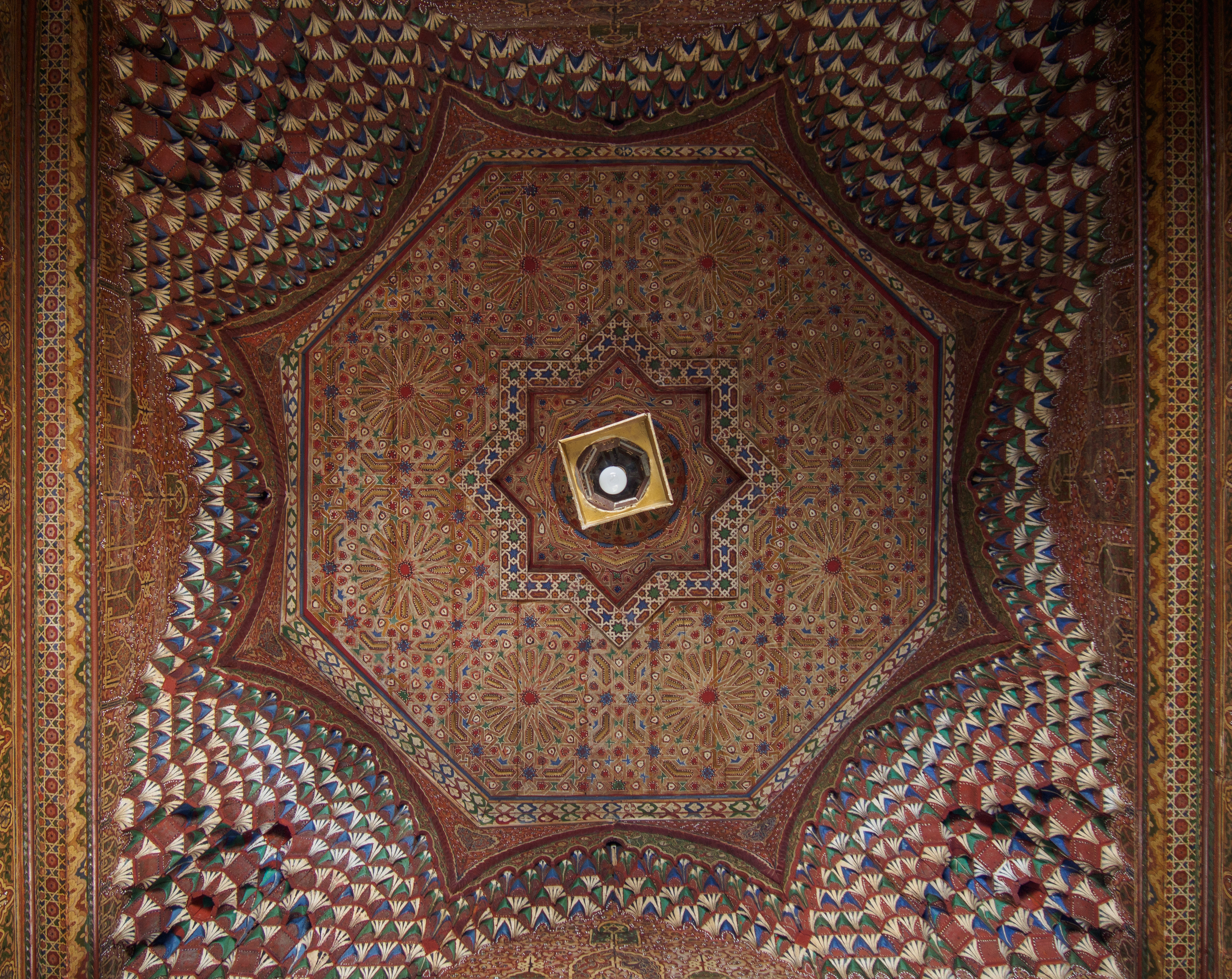
Wooden ceiling with painted and carved muqarnas decoration at the entrance of the Grand Riad

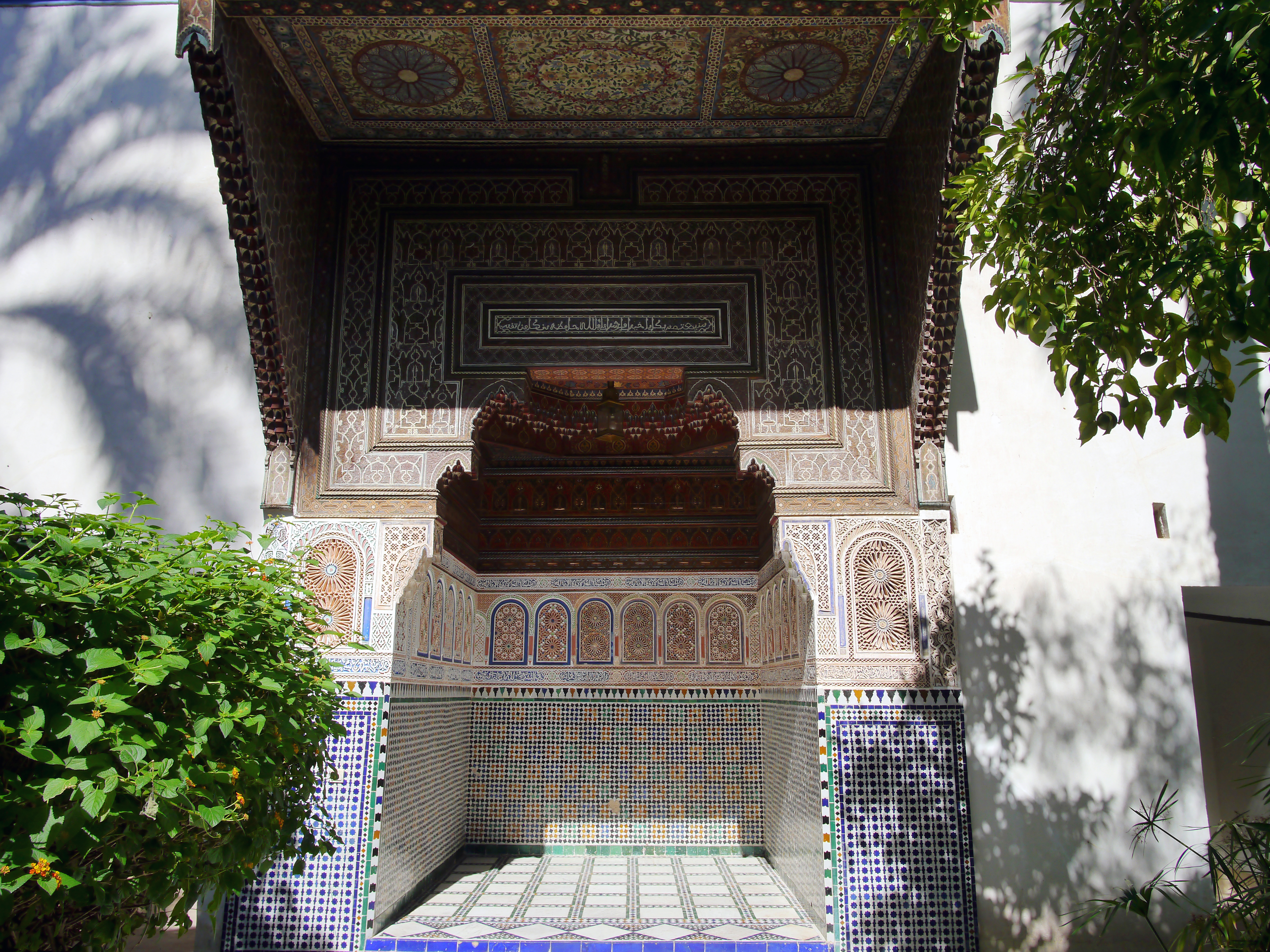
Decorative alcove on the northern side of the garden

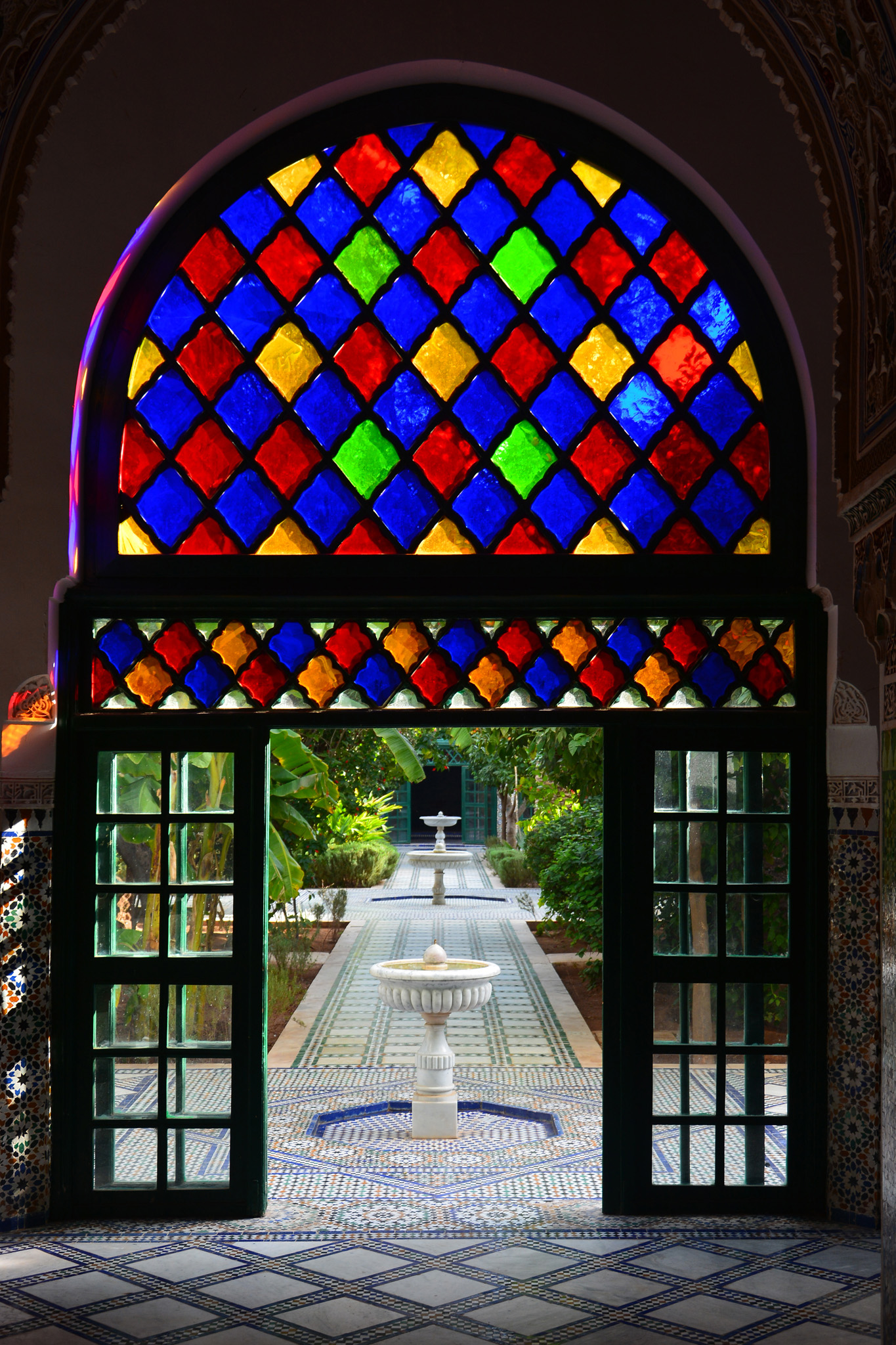
Doorway of the chambers adjoining the garden

==== Other areas ====
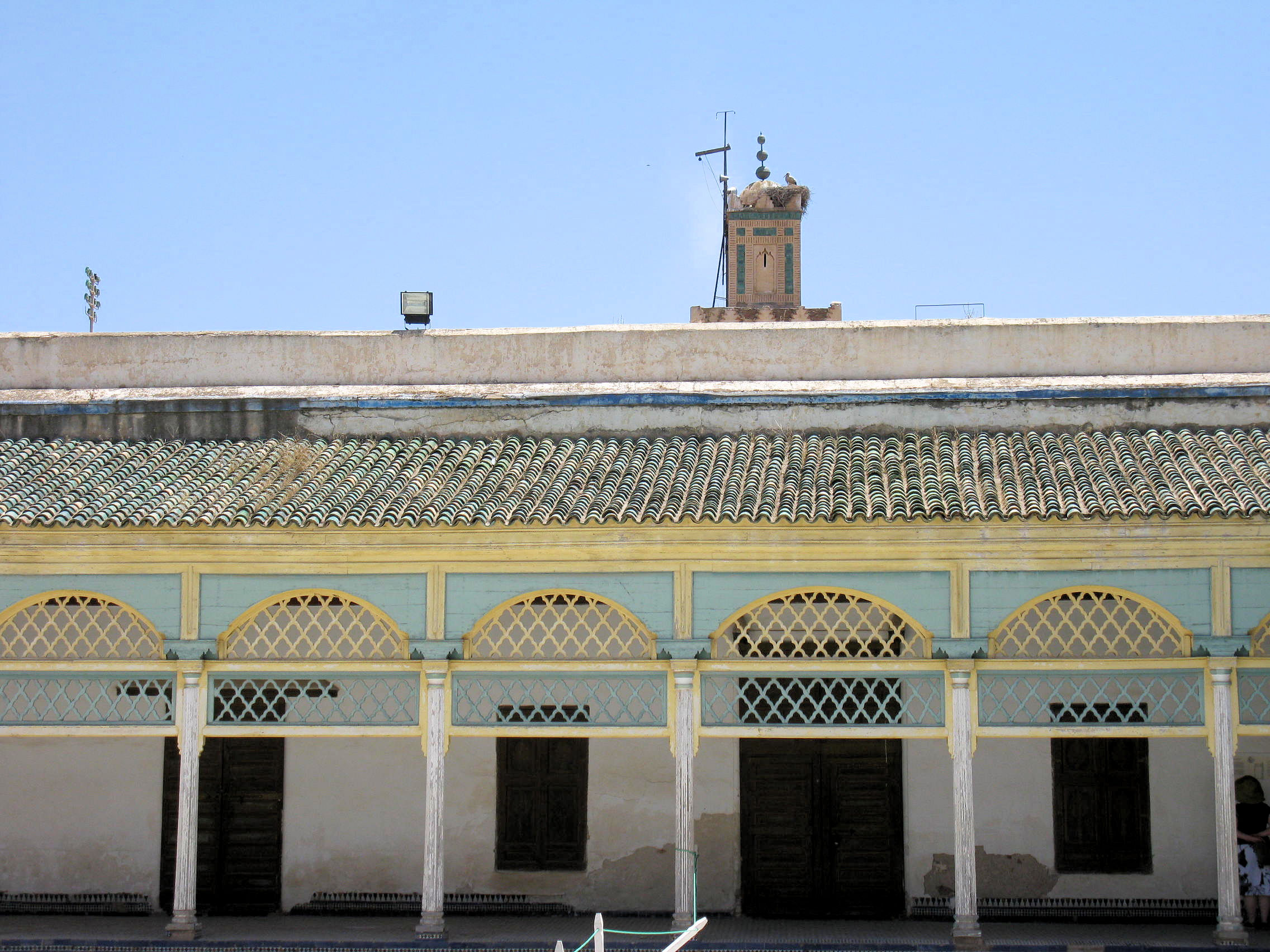
A glimpse of the minaret of the palace mosque, seen from the Grand Courtyard

Further east, beyond the main palace, are the remains of a series of gardens and parks created by Ba Ahmed. Among other elements, they contained a large water basin. This area was originally a Saadian-era garden, the Arsat Ben Chegra, named after a Saadian vizier. On the south side of the palace are other annexes includes stables and a mosque with a minaret.

=== Decoration ===
The palace is most famous for its decoration. Its walls feature stucco carved with Arabic inscriptions, geometric patterns, arabesques, and muqarnas. Its floors are paved with marble and zellij tiles. Among its most famous elements are the cedar-wood ceilings painted with colourful floral patterns, along with the carved and painted wooden canopies of major doorways.

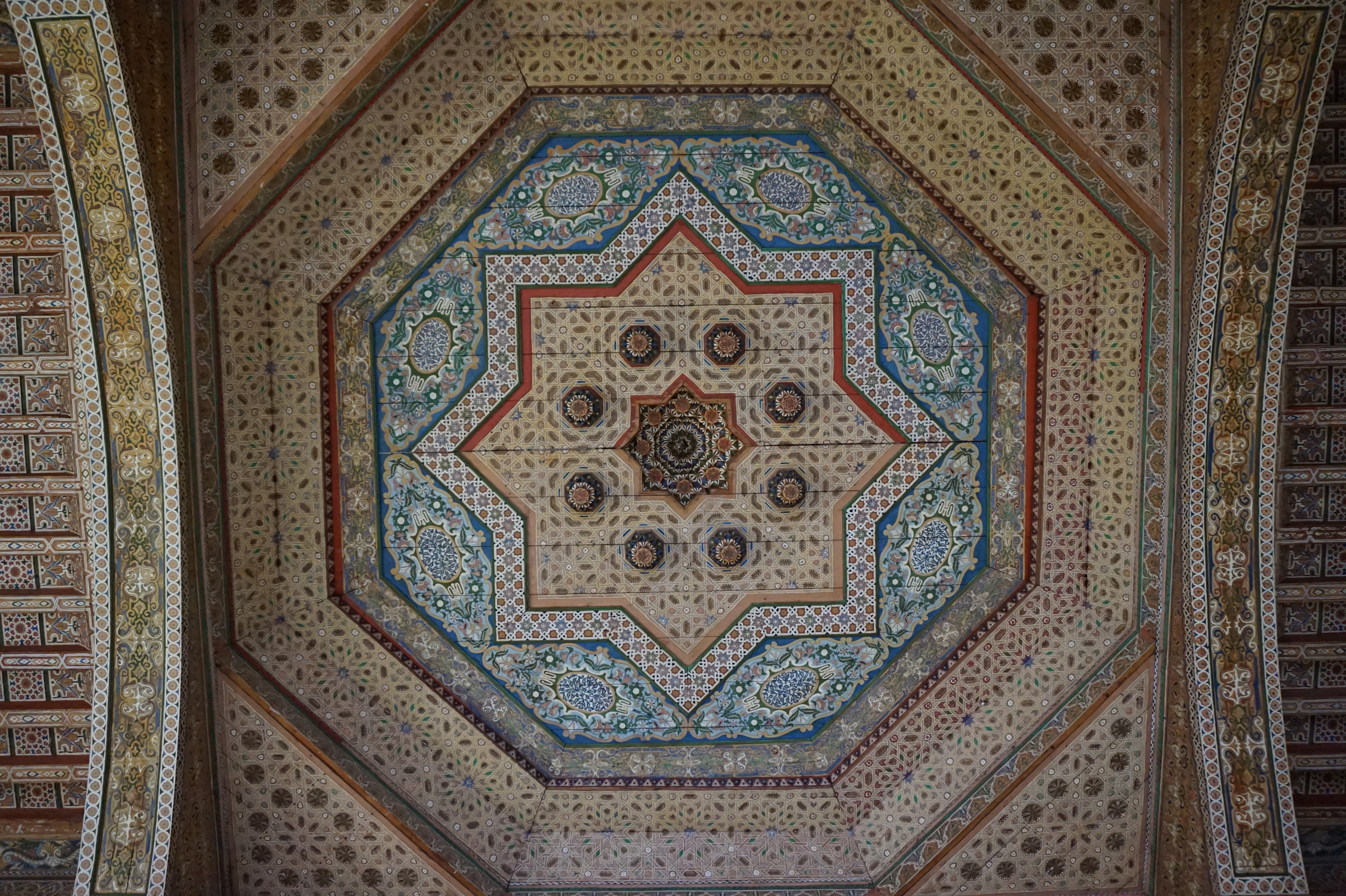
Example of sculpted and painted wood ceiling (in one of the rooms around the Small Courtyard)

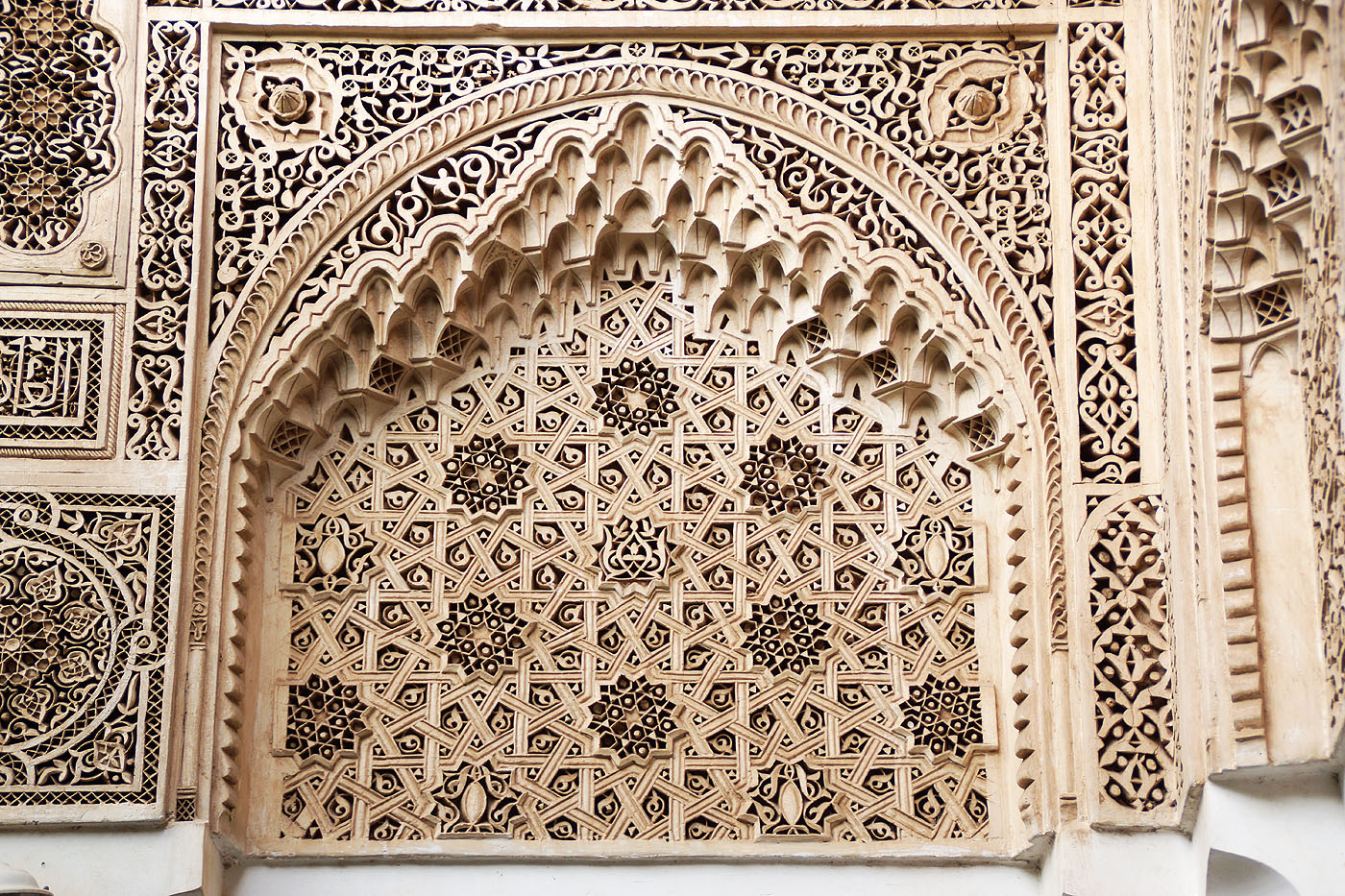
Example of sculpted stucco (in the Small Riad)

The materials for this decoration were imported by Ba Ahmed from all over Morocco, including marble from Meknes (possibly from former Moroccan royal palaces), cedar wood from the Middle Atlas, and tiles from Tetouan. Artisans from all across the country were also employed for the job.
