= Tazouaqt =

Moroccan traditional painting style

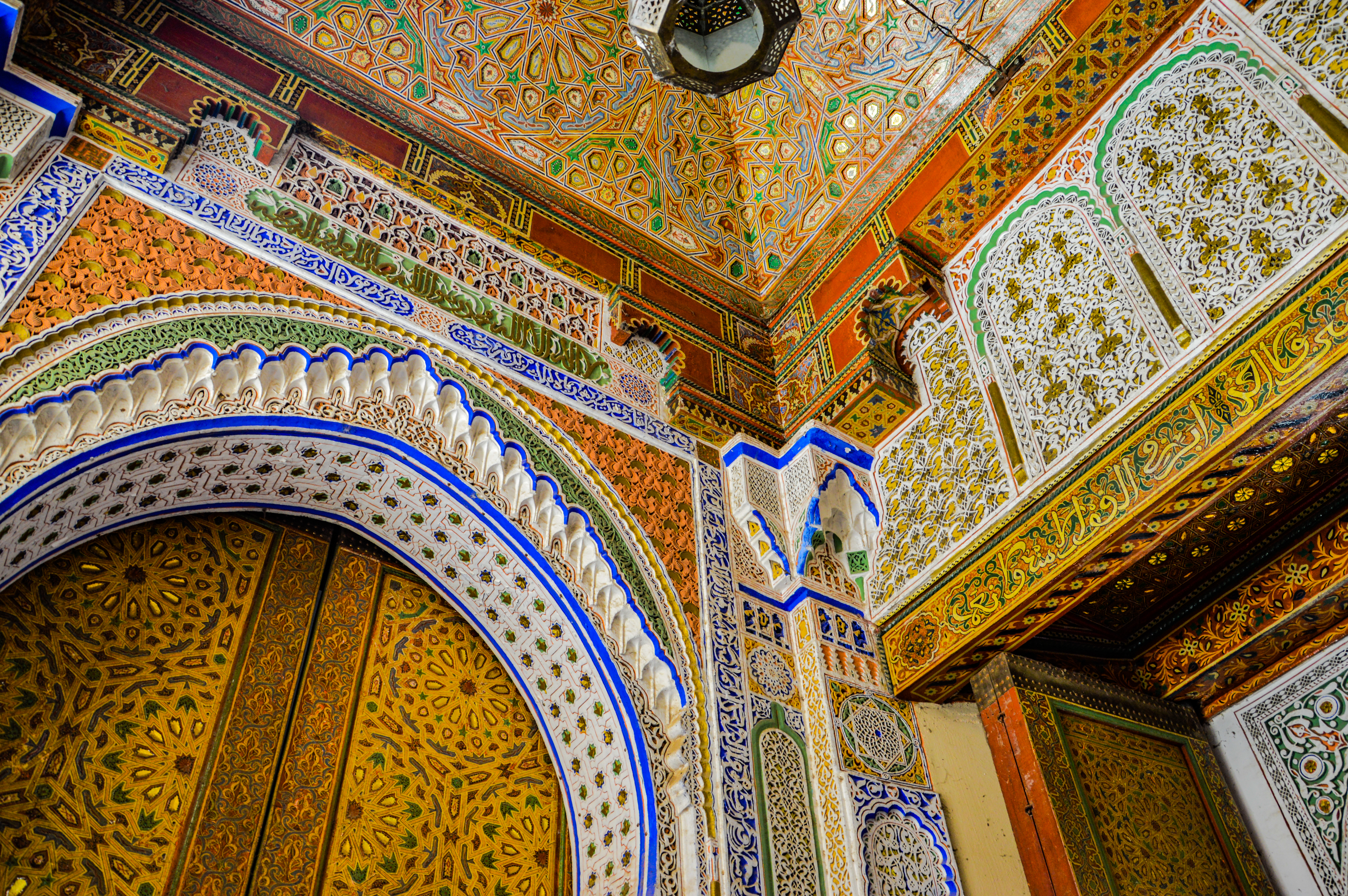
Painted wood at the entrance to the mausoleum of Moulay Idriss II in Fez, Morocco

Tazouaqt (Arabic: تزواقت, in Berber languages: ⵜⴰⵣⵡⵡⴰⵇⵜ), also called Zouaq, refers to the art of traditional painting on wood in Morocco. In cities known for Tazouaqt such as Fez, Marrakech and Chefchaouen, wooden works are not considered completed until they are painted. The Tazouaqt remains one of the most assertive characteristics of architectural craftsmanship in Morocco.

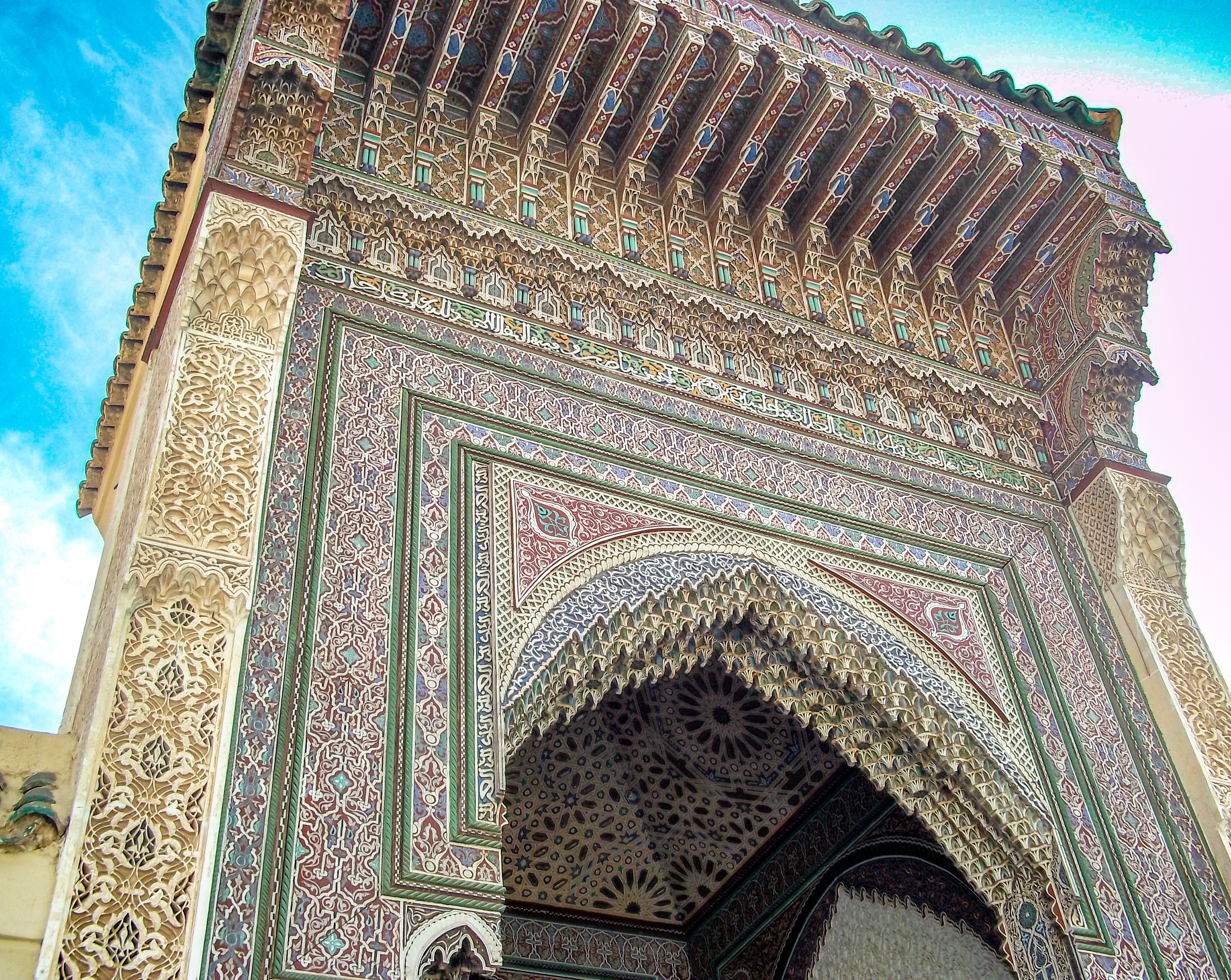
Canopy, facades and painted wooden ceiling of the Sidi Bel Abbas fountain in Marrakech, Morocco

== Patterns of Tazouaqt ==
=== Geometric patterns ===
The zawwaqa (or artisan painters) have an astonishing ability to trace geometric or floral patterns. They know the secrets of "Ḥasba" and "Qasma"; fundamental rules of geometric patterns generally named "Tastīr". Some patterns 'zouaq' have only a geometric composition which, like every technique, obeys the rules of the regulating lines. The Ḥasba and the Qasma represent the methods of constructing pure Moroccan geometric patterns. These methods are not only used for Tazouaqt, but they are used to draw geometric patterns for all other traditional arts: carved wood, plaster, stone or marble, chiseled or engraved metal, zellige, etc. Depending on the surface to be painted, the type of geometric pattern has a coefficient. It is determined by a calculation specific to these processes.

==== Terminology of geometric patterns ====
Geometric drawing methods allow the construction of simple patterns as well as complex ones. For high values of its coefficient, the patterns become more and more complex. some geometric patterns have the shape of a planetary system; large stars in the center surrounded by other small ones. The names of each pattern depend on the number of branches of each star and the central part is named "Na'ora" (ناعورة). If, for example, the central star is 16 pointed, surrounded by stars of 8, then the pattern is called "Stachri Bel Mtammen" meaning "star of 16 with stars of 8".

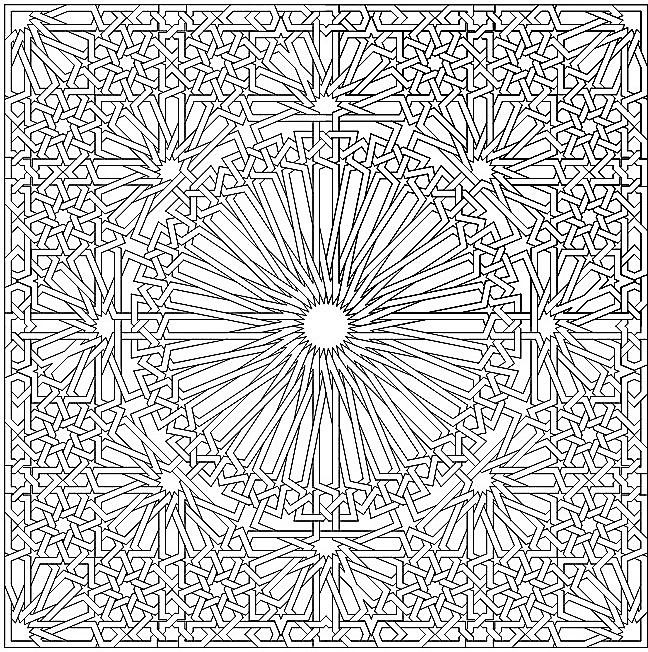
Moroccan geometric pattern "Star of 32".

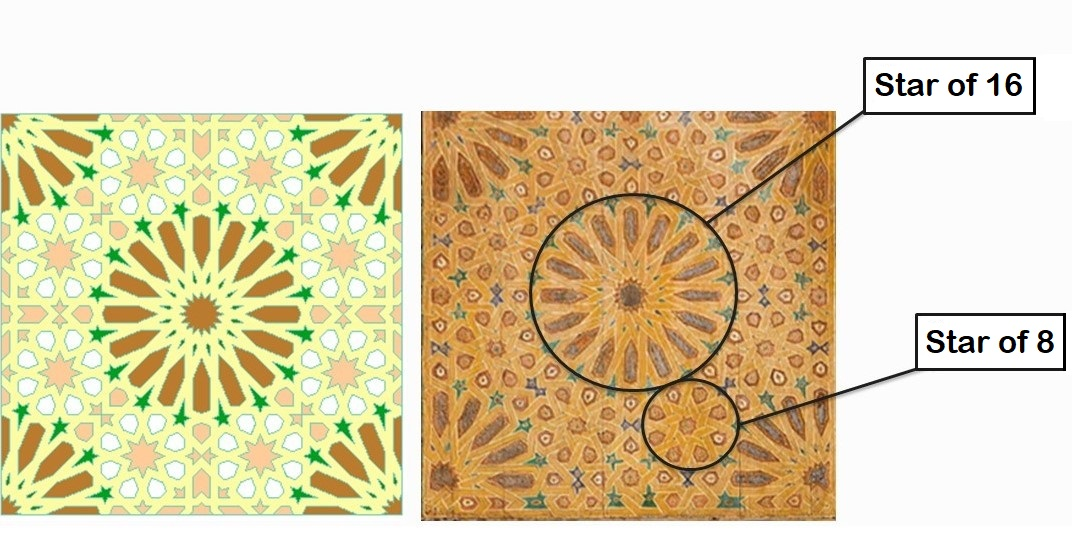
Moroccan geometric pattern of star of 16 surrounded by 8-star, named "Stachri Bel Mtamman".

=== Floral patterns ===
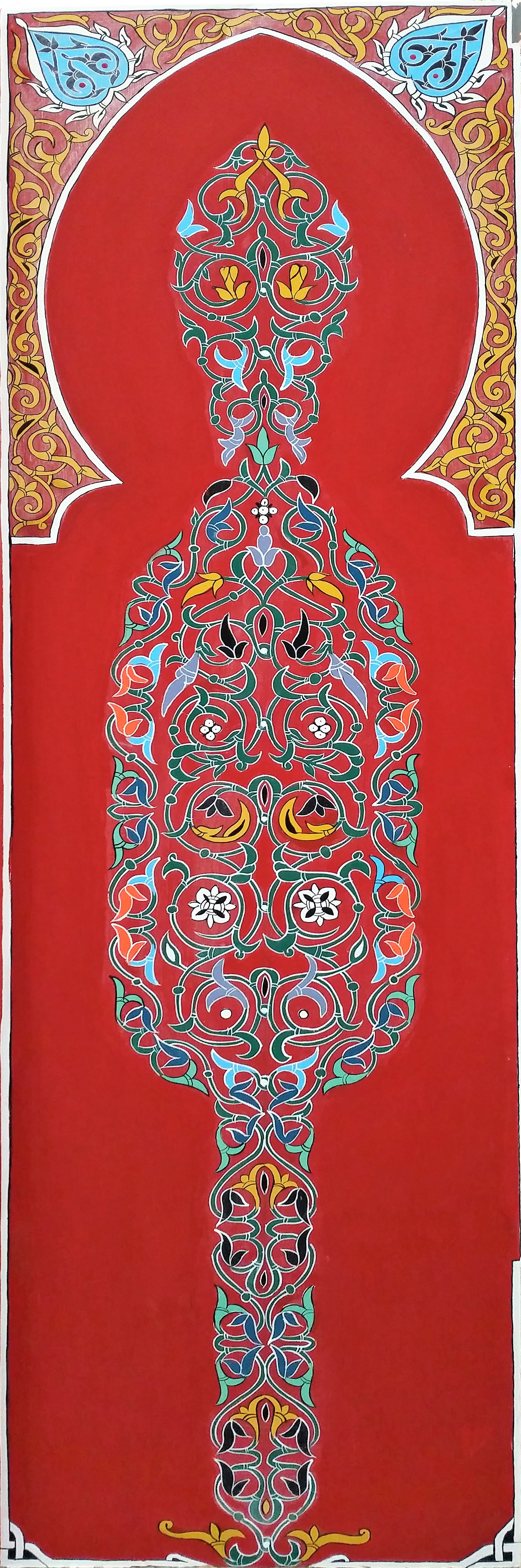
Tawrīq floral pattern on wood.

"Tawrīq" means pattern in the form of a leaf, and "Tashjīr" is an ornament in the form of a tree. The presence of "Tashjīr" is so widespread that it's often seen as the main element of zouaq. This type of ornament is always symmetrical, half of it seems to be reflected in a mirror.

==== Terminology of floral patterns ====
Almost all of the patterns are named after plants or flowers: - Tawrīq: (from waraqa: ورقة) leaf pattern; - Tashjīr: (from Shajara: شجرة) tree-shaped pattern; - ‘Arq: Root; - Qronfel: Carnation; - Sūsān: Basil.

== Zouaq components: Pigments and binders ==
Originally, mineral pigments were often used by mixing it with skin glue and heating the mixture on a brazier (Mejmar). Some paints are based on egg yolk, especially those intended to decorate an ocher background. The origins of the pigments differed from a city to another. In each, the m’allem (craftsman) used local materials available in or around his town. In the following image:

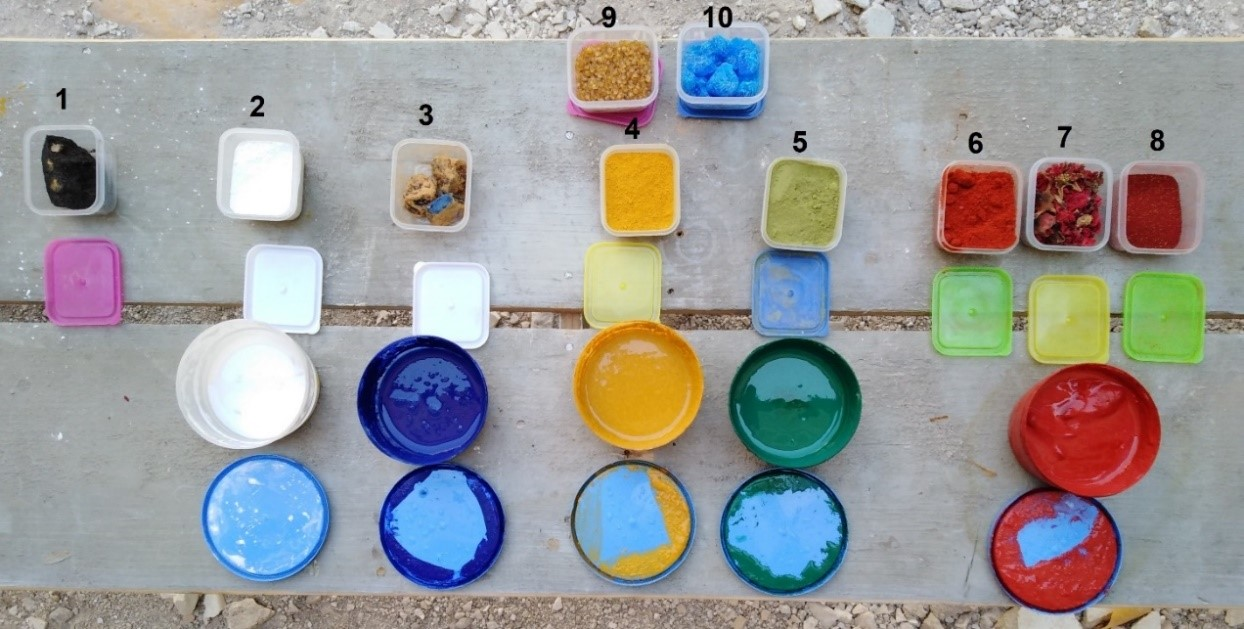
Pigments and binders traditionally used in Tazouaqt.

1. Charred sheep's wool to be mixed with skin glue.
2. Chalky substance that resembles gypsum.
3. Indigo blue "Nila".
4. Turmeric yellow.
5. Henna mixed with pomegranate peels.
6. Paprika.
7. Pomegranate leaf.
8. Poppy powder "‘ekar fāssi " mixed with pomegranate peels.
9. Skin glue used as a binder.
10. Copper sulphate "Ḥedida zarqa".

The red paint, at the bottom right of the image, is obtained by a mixture of paprika, pomegranate leaves, poppy powder and pomegranate peel. The preparation of these natural pigments consists of grinding, traditionally with a mortar and pestle. As for the names of colors, m’allems (craftsmen) had their own jargon. They used several names for each color depending on its degree, for example: "qalb lbanana", which means "banana heart", was used to denote light yellow, and "zraq Ellīl", which means "blue of the night ", was used to denote dark blue. The color obtained from the mixture of two colors was called "Mūssekh" which means dirty (because it is not a single pure color).

== Tools of Tazouaqt: Brushes and stencils ==
=== Donkey Hair Brush ===
The brushes are handmade by the craftsmen themselves, with donkey's mane hair.

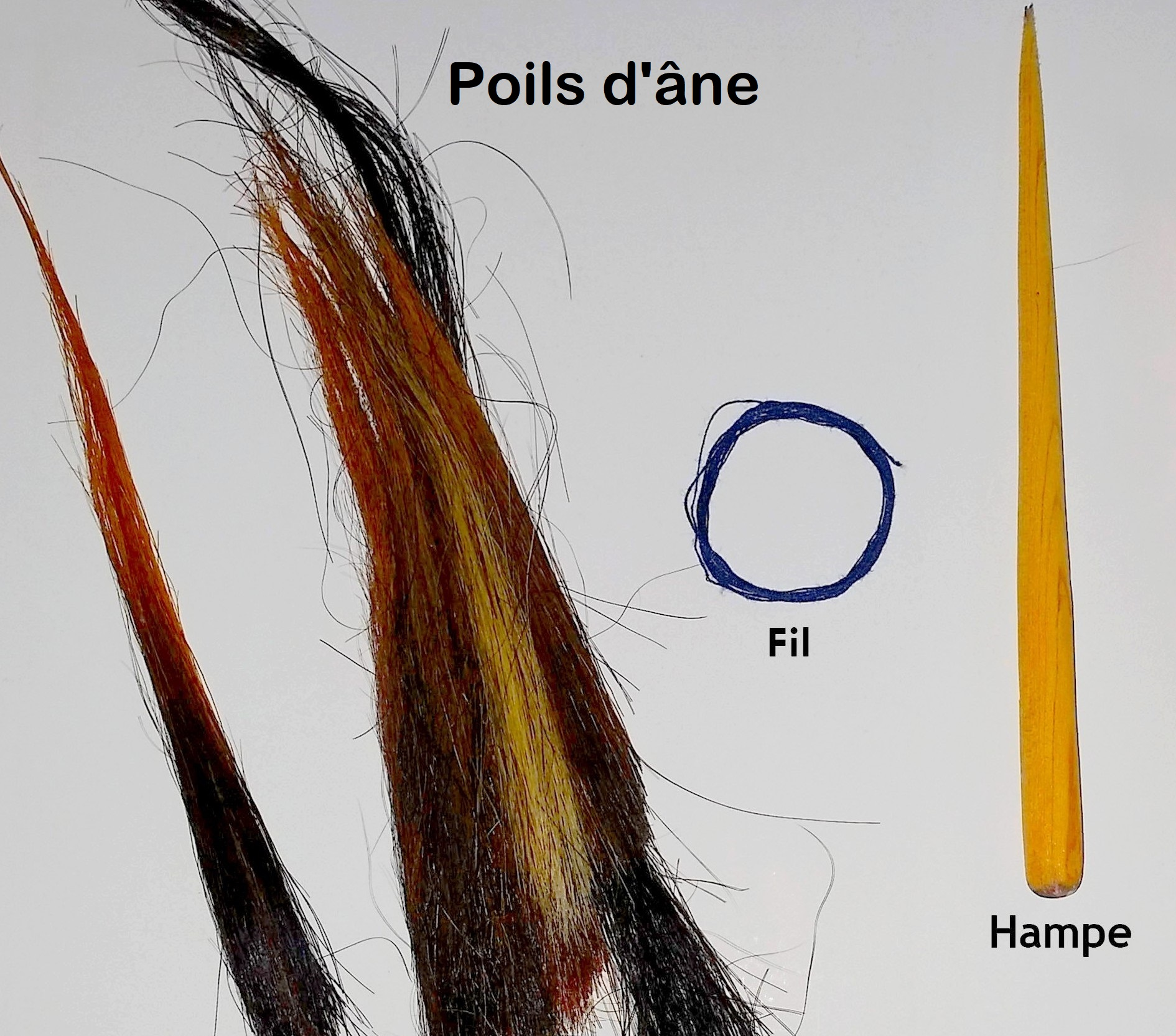
Donkey hair, wire and shaft for traditional brush making

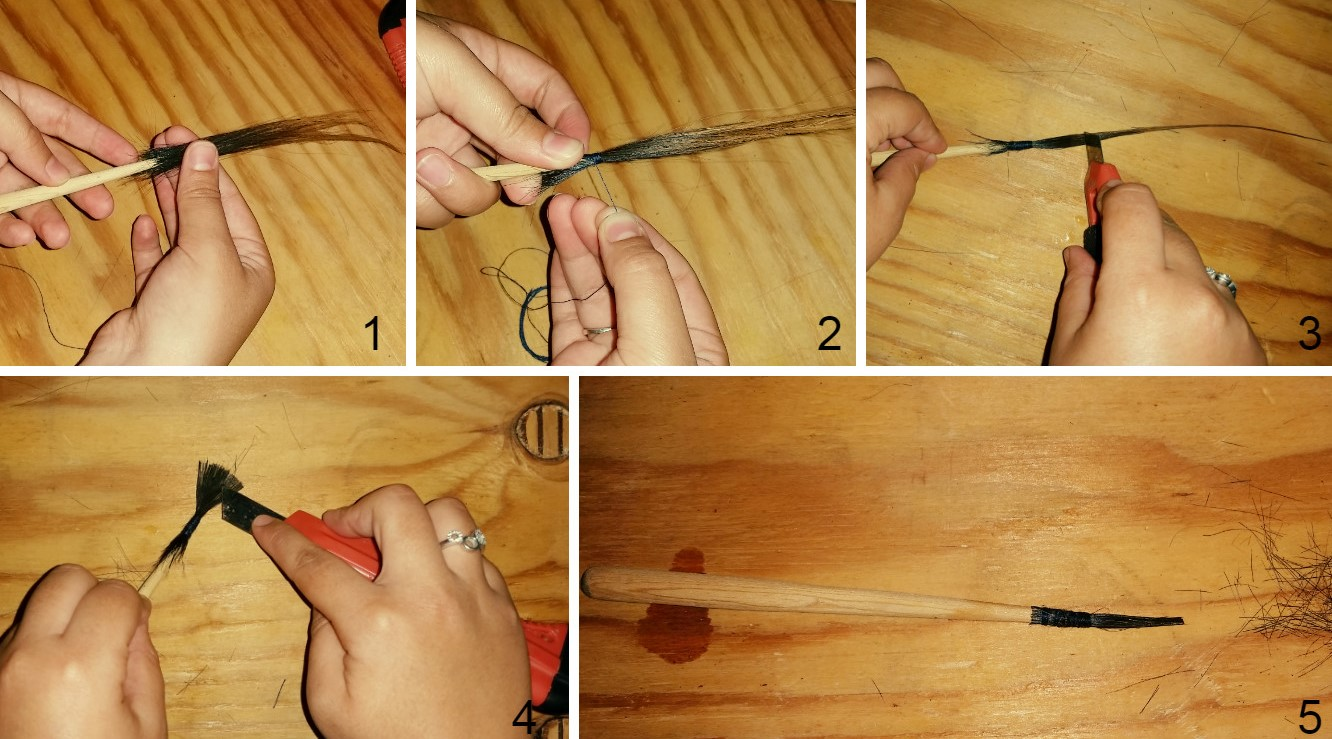
Steps for making traditional donkey hair brush.

=== Stencils ===
The production of the stencil depends on the surface to be painted, whether they are architectural elements of a building (door or window leaves, ceilings, canopies, friezes, etc.) or small objects (tables, stools, mirror frames, chairs ...). the pattern is drawn and painted on card stock, the voids are removed with a wood gouge if it is a floral pattern, and with a wood chisel if the pattern is geometric.

== Process of production ==
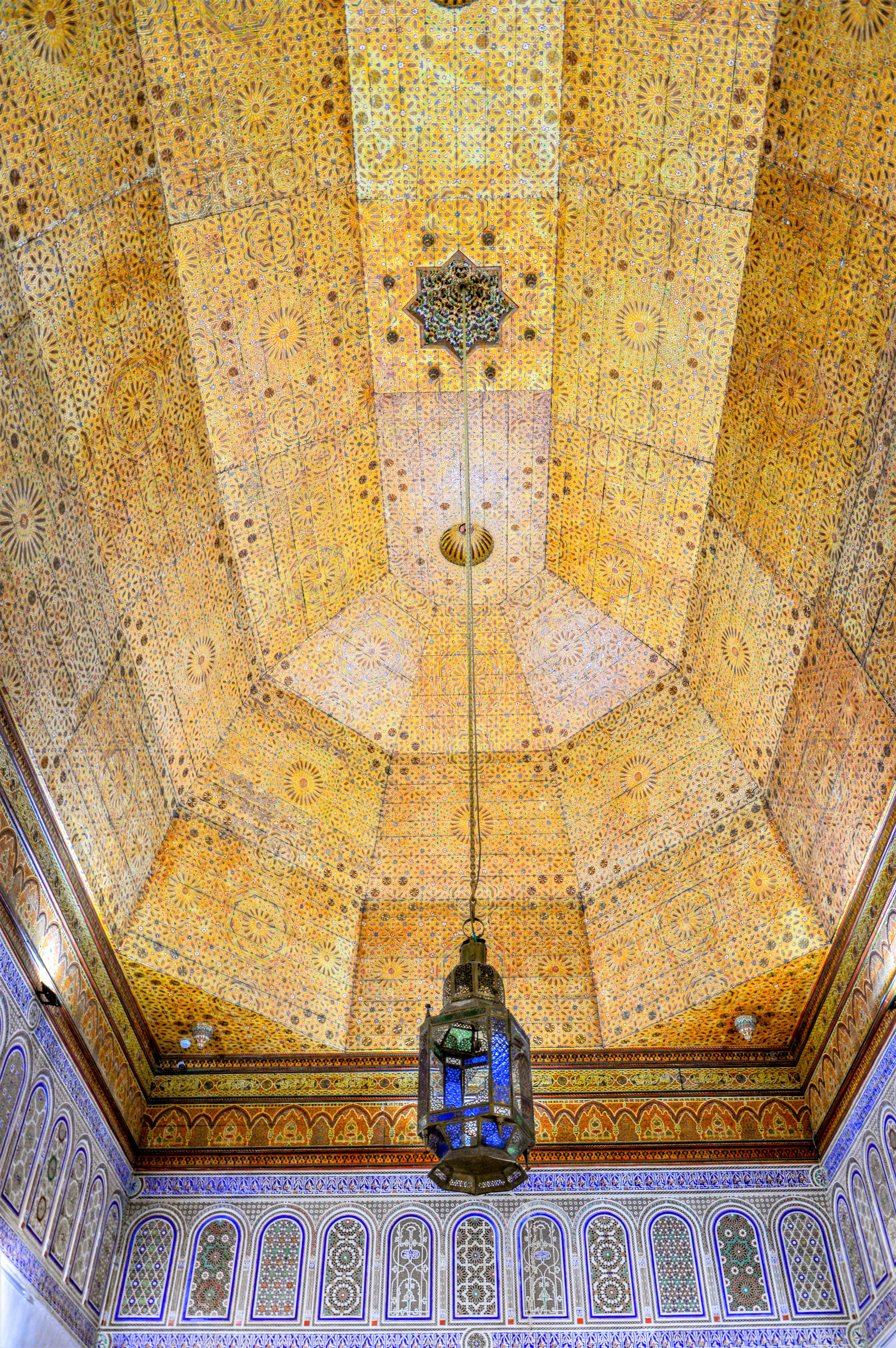
Painted wooden ceiling with a geometric pattern in Dar Si Said in Marrakech.

The technique of zouaq and its patterns are generally codified and the rules of application are known among the M'allems, however, the finesse and the beauty of each work produced depends and differs according to the talent of each M'allem. Moreover, if two craftsmen work, for example, on the same ceiling, distinguishing the zouaq performed by each M'allem is not very difficult if you look at it closely. In general, the carpenter prepares the wood, then the Tazouaqt is done following these three steps:

=== Pattern printing ===
The printing of the pattern on the surface which is already painted with a background solid color, which is often the red ocher color. To imprint the traces of the pattern, the craftsman uses a hand-made powder pad.

=== "Triḥ" ===
With the colors already selected and prepared, and using the traditional brush, the traced pattern is painted (where the surface is free of powder) with precision and without trembling, by placing the hand bearing the brush on the palm of the other hand.

=== "Tazyīn" ===
Once the paint applied in the “Trih” stage has dried, there is no longer any need for the powder which marked the pattern, so we get rid of it. Then we draw a thin line on the edges of the pattern with a thinner brush, with the white or black color.

== Finishing layer ==
The use of a varnish based on linseed oil was a fundamental matter for painted woods. A layer of this varnish was enough to protect the painted decoration. The application is simple, after the assured drying of the paint, a cloth soaked in linseed oil varnishes the surface.
