= Wezeea =

Algerian religious custom

A Wazīʿa (Arabic: وزيعة) or Thawzīʿath, also known as Thamšeraṭeth (ثامشرطث), is the term used in Algeria to designate one of the cultural customs in a Sufi society observed by the inhabitants of rural areas, especially the Berbers of Kabylia.

== Presentation ==
The Wazīʿa is not only widespread in Kabylia, but also in the Aurès, M'zab, and elsewhere in the country.

It are organized on several occasions and mawsims, especially during Ashura, Ramadan, Mawlid, and the beginning of the plowing season.

The disciples slaughter several cows, which the families and philanthropists share in buying, and they distribute the meat so that all the village's families receive some.

Poor people who do not share in the price of the cows get their share of the meat as well. This makes this habit more of a social solidarity event than something else and is considered an Algerian cultural heritage.

Sufi orders, especially the Rahmaniyya, contribute to preserving this custom in the rural regions.

== Practices ==
Since the Wezeea is one of the customs and traditions that the inhabitants of the Kabylia region inherited from grandfathers, the villagers collect money to buy calves or bulls, and the number of bulls sometimes reaches 17 or 20 bulls.

If there are many families in the village, the slaughter process takes place on a predetermined day, usually on the day of Friday prayer, then the meat is cut into equal portions according to the number of members of each family, and the meat rations are distributed after that to the families living in the village in equal measure, so that there is no discrimination in the division.

After distributing the meat to the families, the preparation process for the harvesting of olives and the demonstration of Tweeza begins, which usually takes place in traditional methods at the end of the autumn season, and the preparation is by cleaning the sides of the olive trees and removing weeds and branches that are useless from them and around them.

Wezeea is therefore one of the most important manifestations of solidarity that characterizes the residents of the villages, madashir and neighborhoods of the Kabylia region. It is a solidarity process in addition to being an occasion linked to land and water, where the residents used to approach their Allah Almighty Lord by slaughtering calves and cows and distributing their meat to the poor people seeking help.

And now this custom has become associated with the advent of religious occasions and Islamic holidays such as Eid al-Fitr, Qadr Night, and the Mawlid, and some of them hold it to celebrate the Amazigh New Year called Yennayer corresponding to the twelfth of January of each year in the Gregorian calendar.

== See also ==
- Zawiyas in Algeria
- List of Sufi orders
- Culture of Algeria
- Mawlid
- Mawsim
- Yennayer
- Ziyarat
- Fantasia
- Marabout
- Saint
- Barakah
- Sebiba
- Tweeza
- Thadjmaath
- Achewiq
