= Sebiba =

Folk dance tradition of the Tuareg

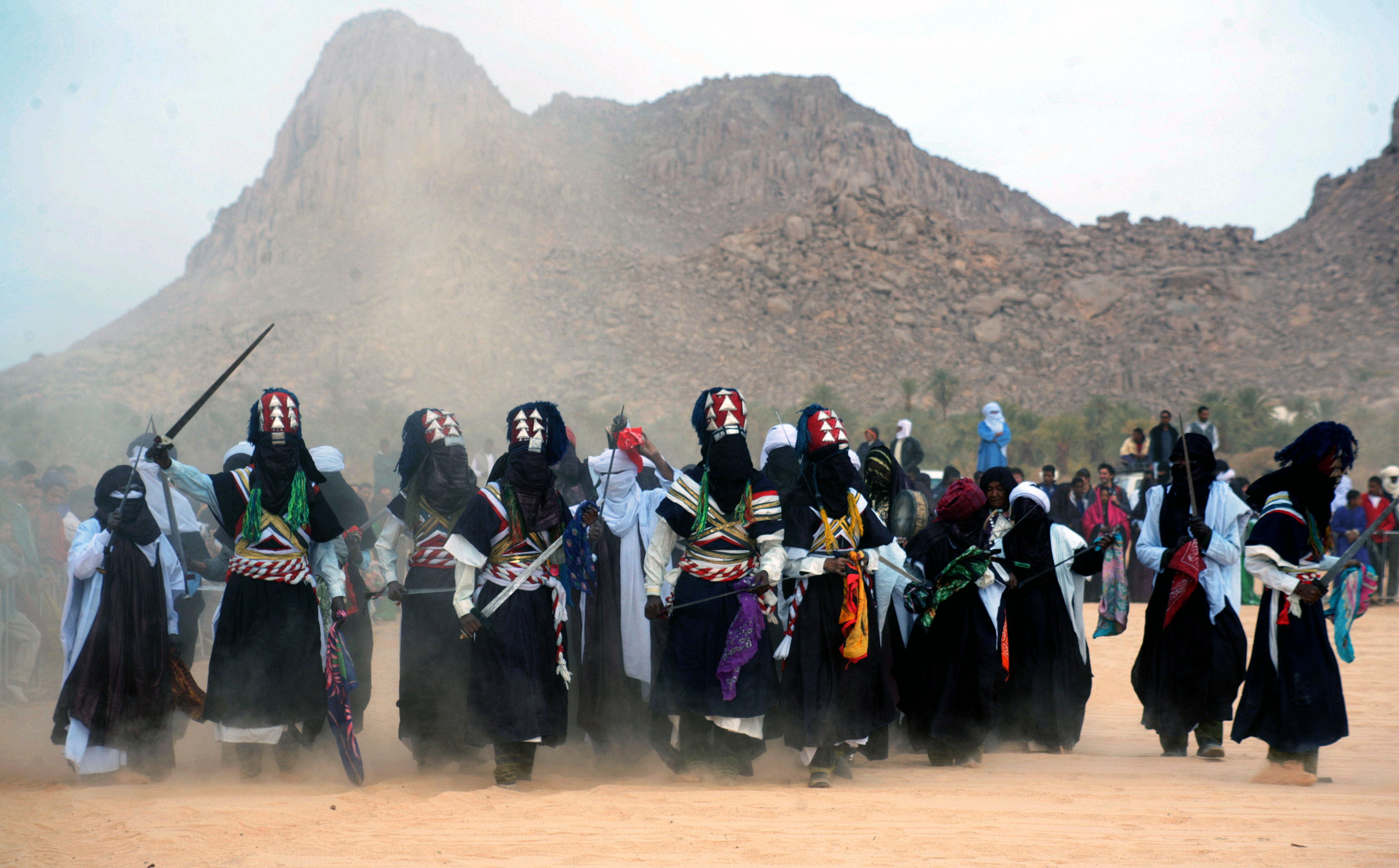
Sebiba Touareg Exhibition of Djanet in Algeria.

Sebiba (Arabic: سبيبة, Tifinagh: ⵙⴱⵉⴱⴰ) is the term used in Algeria to designate a festival and the Tuareg people's dance performed on this occasion and accompanied by female drummers in the Sahara oasis of Djanet in the Tassili n'Ajjer region in southern Algeria. The dance was recognized by UNESCO in 2014 for its significance to humanity's intangible cultural heritage.

== Cultural background ==
The Sebiba dance and drum music is rooted in the blacksmith class, or Inaden, among the Moorish Bidhan Tuareg people in Algeria and the Sahel region. The inaden, which made all tools, weapons and jewelry for society, formed a distinct cultural echelon within Tuareg society after being excluded for the two traditional social classes.

The other traditional classes among the Bidhan were the aristocrats, Imajeghen or Imuhagh in Tamasheq language, corresponding to the warriors class (hassan), and the Iklan, slaves or Abīd (Arabic: عبيد). Today, the slaves kidnapped from the Sudan region are free today and form the majority within Tuareg society.

== Characteristics ==
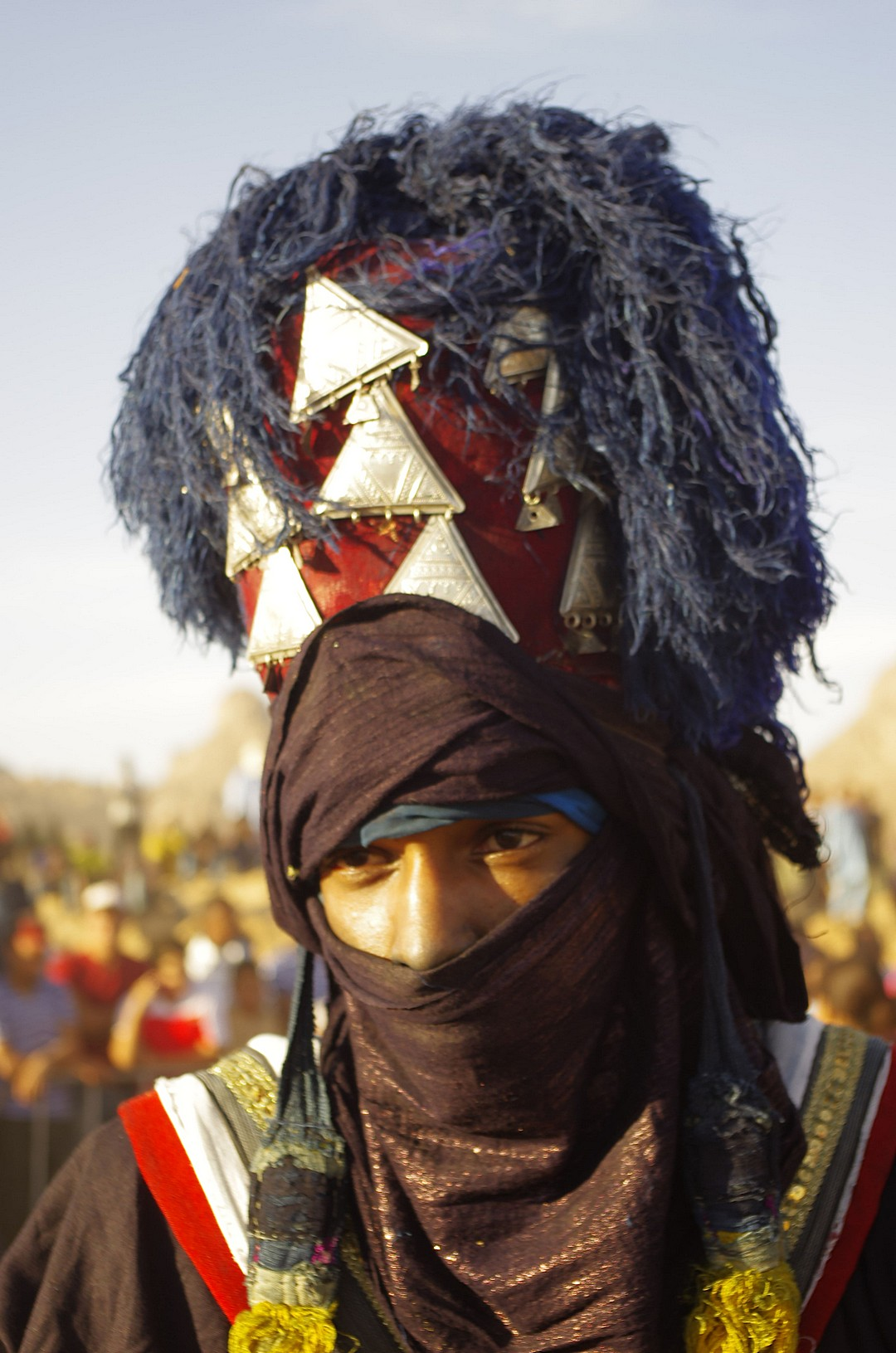
Sebiba murid.

The first day through the tenth day of the first Islamic month of Muharram is the time for rites of passage that usher in the new year. The climax is the tenth day, the Ashura day (Arabic: عاشوراء), which has other religious meanings depending on the Islamic denomination.

New Hijri Year's Day is the following eleventh Muharram. In Djanet, Sebiba is the dance and the entire city festival at the turn of the year.

In Agadez in northern Niger, the Tuareg people celebrate the Bianu festival with dances and parades on the same occasion.

At the Bianu and at the Sebiba festival, the course of the event is formed by the contrast between two population groups: With the Bianu, the city of Agadez is divided into an east and west half for the duration of the event, the residents of the Ksar come for the Sebiba festival, Azellouaz and Ksar El Mihan against each other.

The festival brings back memories of a long conflict that has now been resolved between the two villages. The place Adjahil does not take part in the celebrations, presumably the religious prohibition by the Sufi Tariqa of the Senusiyya, which maintained a Zawiya in Adjahil at the beginning of the 20th century.

The cultural background of the Sebiba also includes the mythological idea of the end of the year, a new beginning and an interim period that is in transition and dissolving during the duration of the festival. This general cosmogonic concept is passed down as Tuareg customs (Tagdudt) and is said to have been known to nomadic Tuaregs in the past.

The idea of a chaotic transition period relates to the seasonal regeneration of nature, but can also be associated with a mythological reassurance of the power of black African rulers. There, the kingship goes through a regularly recurring phase of ritual anarchy, in which the relations of rule are turned upside down and sham battles are carried out until the ruler has finally been confirmed as having his divine origin.

The temporal equation with Ashura makes the rites, originally referred to as pre-Islamic, a part of everyday Islamic culture and therefore acceptable for a large part of the Muslim Tuareg. Nevertheless, there are Muslim groups who reject the Sebiba as un-Islamic because of their origin and the way they are carried out.

Oral tradition traces the origin of the Sebiba back to the death of Pharaoh, who drowned in the Red Sea while persecuting Moses (Sidi Moussa) and the Jews, in accordance with Sunni Islamic tradition on the origin of Ashura. At that time, good triumphed over evil, which is expressed in the new beginning of nature during the Ashura days.

To give thanks for the victory, the Sebiba is said to have been invented. To distinguish it from Sebiba dances, which can also be performed in other villages at weddings and other private celebrations, the festival on Ashura Day is called Sebiba n’Tililin (other spelling Sebeiba ou Tillellin).

Other dances of the originally black population of the Maghreb are the Stambali, a Tunisian dance that is part of an obsession rite and its Moroccan counterpart Derdeba. The Algerian dance of the Berber women Abdaoui also has a seasonal reference.

== World heritage ==
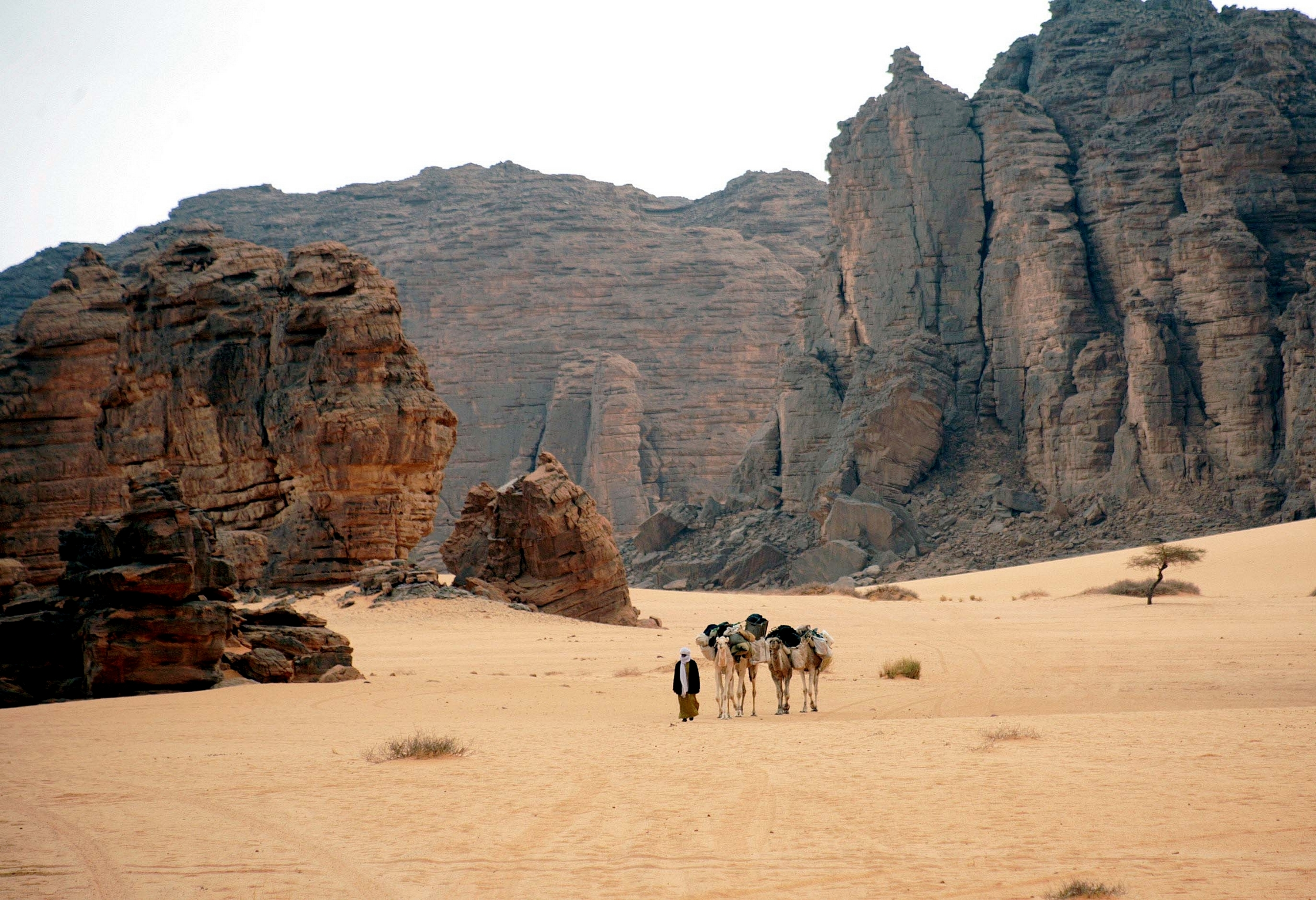
Tassili n'Ajjer in Algerian Sahara.

The feast of Sebiba in Algerian Sahara has been classified as Tuareg heritage and Cultural heritage forming part of the world heritage of humanity, where the traditional costume made for the occasion holds a central place.

The ritual and ceremonies of Sebiba in the oasis of Djanet were inscribed in the year 2014 among the UNESCO lists of the Intangible Cultural Heritage of Humanity.

The dance in this festival is a dance genre being part of the UNESCO lists of intangible cultural heritage, associated with singing, music and celebrations.

The Sebiba includes celebratory, ritual dance, folk songs and drumming, social dances localised and practised mainly in the Algerian Sahara.

This classified dance form is officially recognised as an Algerian cultural heritage, and has a very international dimension and touristic attraction.

Sebiba dance is a very complex phenomenon, which involves culture, traditions, the use of human bodies, artefacts (such as costumes and props), as well as a specific use of music, space and sunshine light.

As a result, a lot of tangible and intangible elements are combined within Sebiba dance, making it a challenging type of Algerian and Tuareg heritage to safeguard.

== Gallery ==
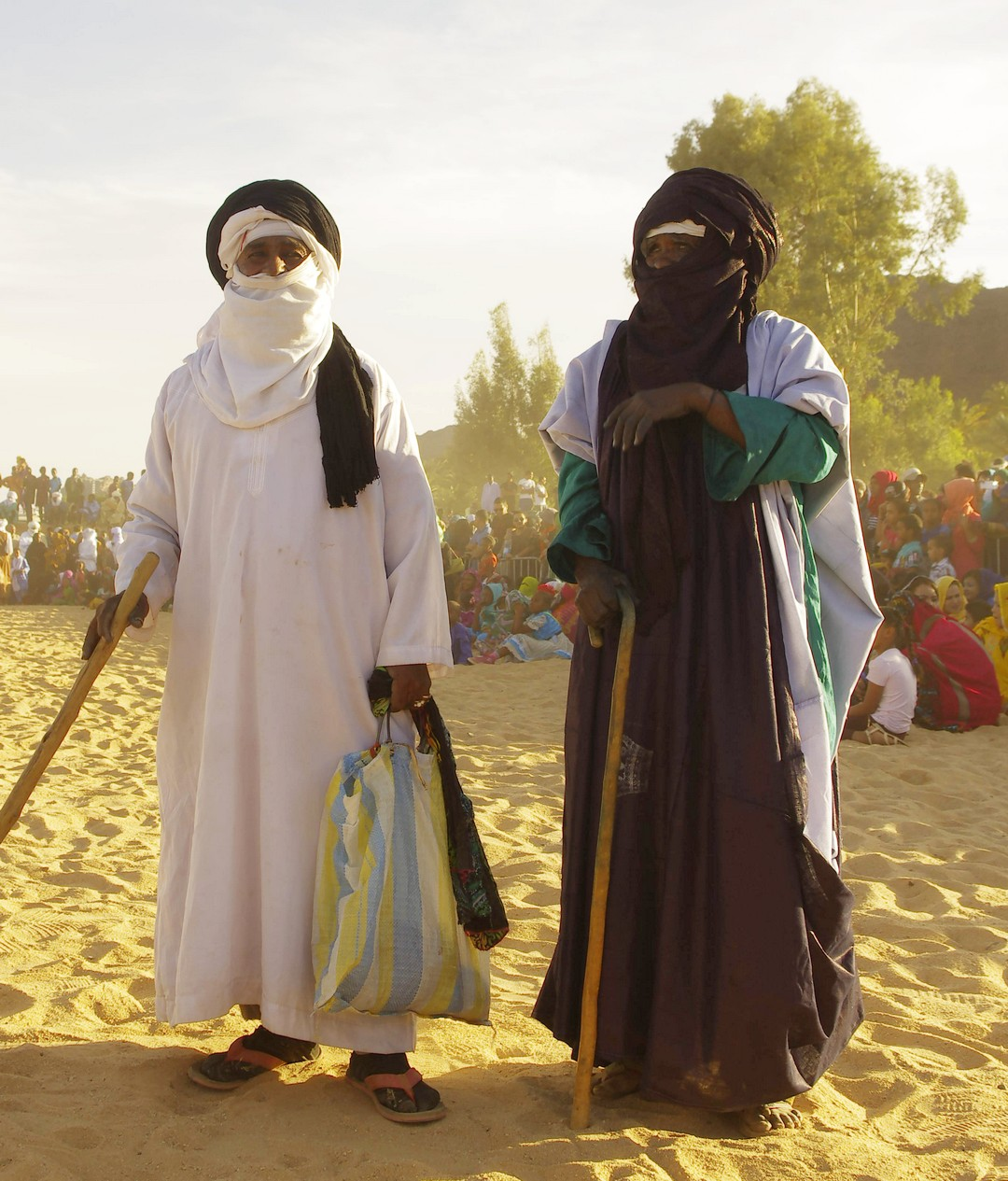
Sebiba shuyukhs.

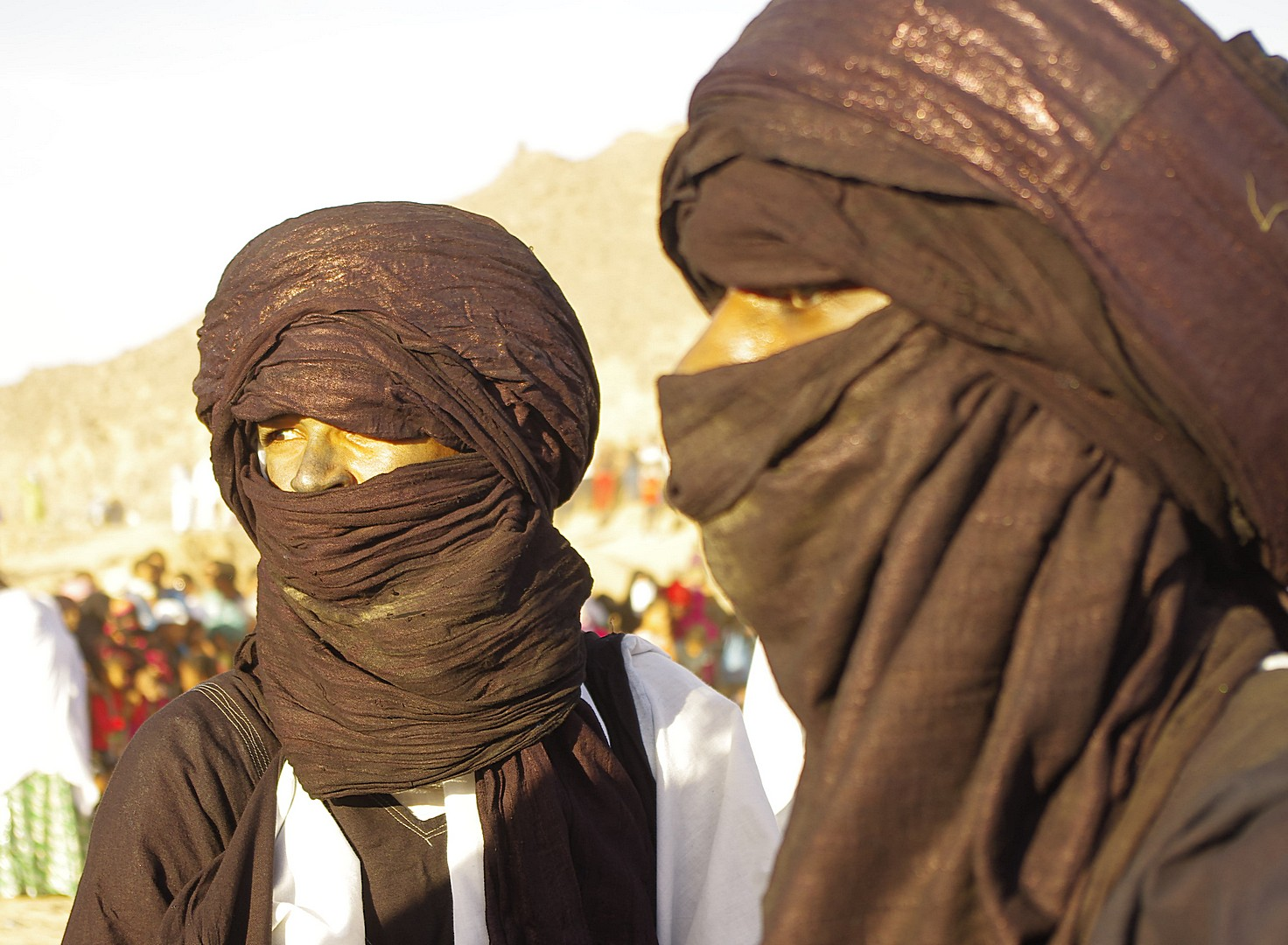
Sebiba dancers.

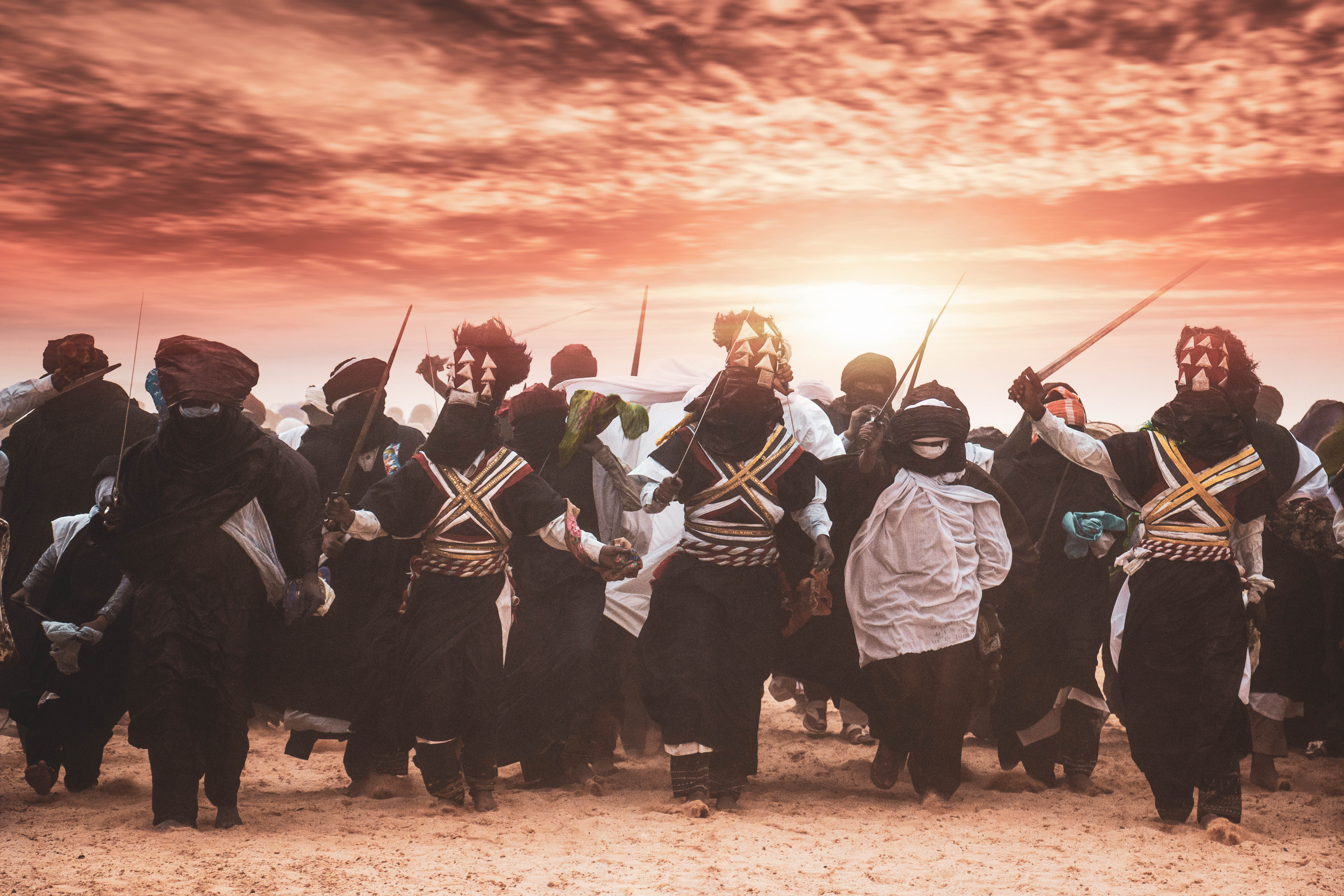
Sebiba dance.

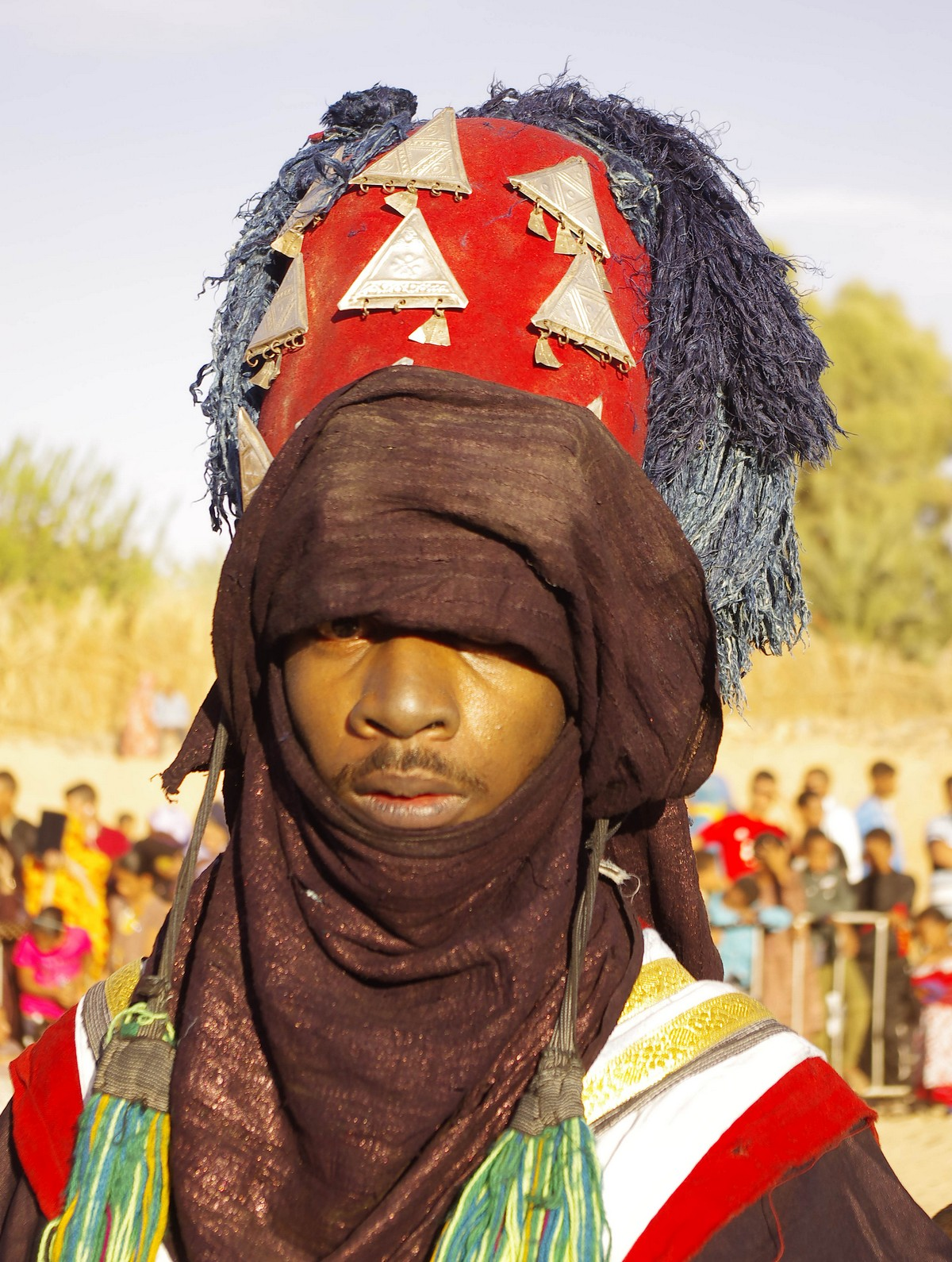
Sebiba murid.

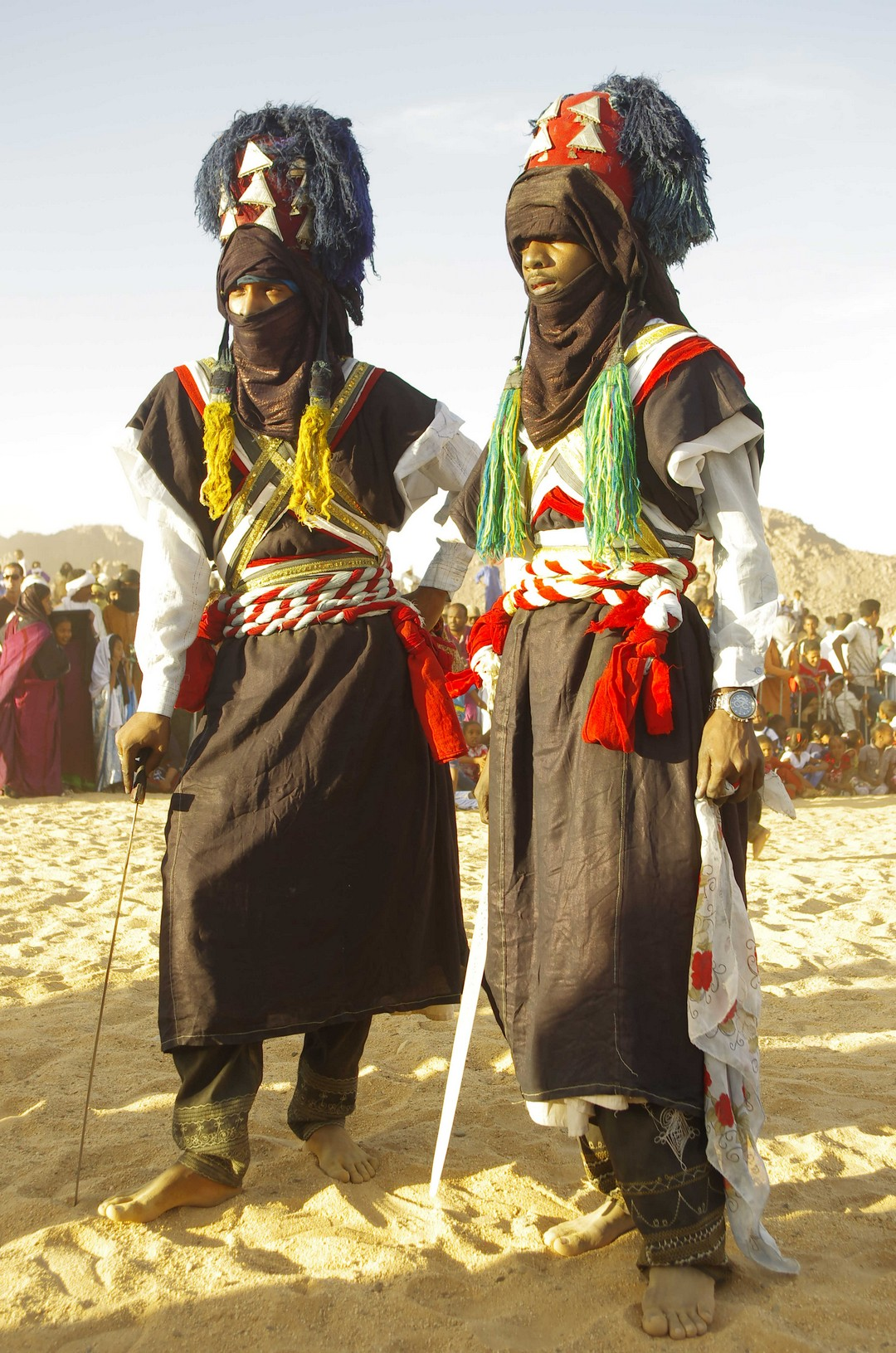
Sebiba murids.

== See also ==
- Zawiyas in Algeria
- Senusiyya
- Cultural heritage
- UNESCO Intangible Cultural Heritage Lists
- Mawlid
- Ashura
- Mawsim
- Imzad
- Tweeza
- Yennayer
- Ziyarat
- Fantasia
- Marabout
- Saint
- Barakah
- Wezeea
