= Amine El Gotaibi =

Moroccan conceptual artist

- Born: 1983 (age 42–43); Fez, Morocco
- Education: National Institute of Fine Arts, Tétouan
- Known for: Sculpture, installation art
- Website: amineelgotaibi.com

Amine El Gotaibi (born 1983) is a Moroccan conceptual artist based in Marrakesh. Working across sculpture and large-scale installation, his practice combines natural and traditional materials such as wool and rammed earth with industrial materials including copper and Corten steel. His work frequently addresses territory, identity and representations of the African continent.

El Gotaibi has exhibited internationally, including at the Institut du Monde Arabe in Paris, the Young Congo Biennale, the NIROX Foundation in South Africa and Somerset House in London. In 2023, he created Illuminate the Light, a large-scale installation commissioned for the courtyard of Somerset House during the 1-54 Contemporary African Art Fair.

== Early life and education ==
El Gotaibi was born in Fez, Morocco, in 1983. He studied at the National Institute of Fine Arts in Tétouan, graduating in 2008.

== Career and work ==
El Gotaibi works across sculpture, installation and collaborative projects. His works frequently combine materials such as wool, earth and metal. Morocco, North Africa and the wider African continent are recurring geographical and conceptual references in his work.

In 2011, El Gotaibi initiated VISIT to Okavango, a long-term research project conceived around a journey from Morocco towards Botswana and South Africa.

His work Arena of Submission (2014), which developed from his response to the Arab Spring, was exhibited at the Institut du Monde Arabe in Paris as part of the exhibition Le Maroc contemporain.

In 2016, he developed Attorab Al Watani (National Territory), a participatory project involving the regions of Morocco.

At the Young Congo Biennale in 2019, El Gotaibi presented Ba Moyi Ya Afrika (The Suns of Africa), an installation composed of projectors used as sources of light representing the African continent.

During a residency at the NIROX Foundation in South Africa, he created Sun(W)hole – Piece of Cradle 1 (2019–2020), a rammed-earth wall measuring approximately 15 metres in length.

== Illuminate the Light ==
In 2023, El Gotaibi was commissioned to create Illuminate the Light for the Edmond J. Safra Fountain Court at Somerset House in London during the 1-54 Contemporary African Art Fair.

The installation comprised a group of geometric sculptures made from Corten steel and inspired by the forms of pomegranate seeds. The individual forms were conceived as representations of diversity within the African continent, while light was incorporated into the sculptures as both a physical material and a metaphor. The work sought to challenge stereotypical representations of Africa as a "dark continent" by presenting light as a metaphor for the continent's diversity and resources.

El Gotaibi was the subject of a profile in the Financial Times on the occasion of the commission.

== Later work ==
In 2024, El Gotaibi participated in the inaugural Design Doha biennale in Doha, Qatar. His site-specific installation Desert of the North was installed in the central atrium of The Ned Doha. The installation combined wool and copper, using the contrasting materials to explore their interaction with the architecture, light and environmental conditions of the site.

El Gotaibi has also participated in Design Doha's Qatar–Morocco residency programme, which brought together Moroccan and Qatari artists, designers and craftspeople.

== Exhibitions and representation ==
El Gotaibi presented the solo exhibition VISITE at MCC Gallery in Marrakesh in 2021–2022.

His work has been presented at venues and events including the Institut du Monde Arabe in Paris, the Young Congo Biennale, the NIROX Foundation in South Africa, Somerset House in London and Design Doha in Qatar.

El Gotaibi is represented by Southern Guild, which has galleries in Cape Town and New York.

In 2026, his studio and practice were featured in Attitude Interior Design magazine's "Inside Creative Marrakech".
