= Touria El Glaoui =

Franco-Moroccan businesswoman and 1-54 founding director (born 1974)

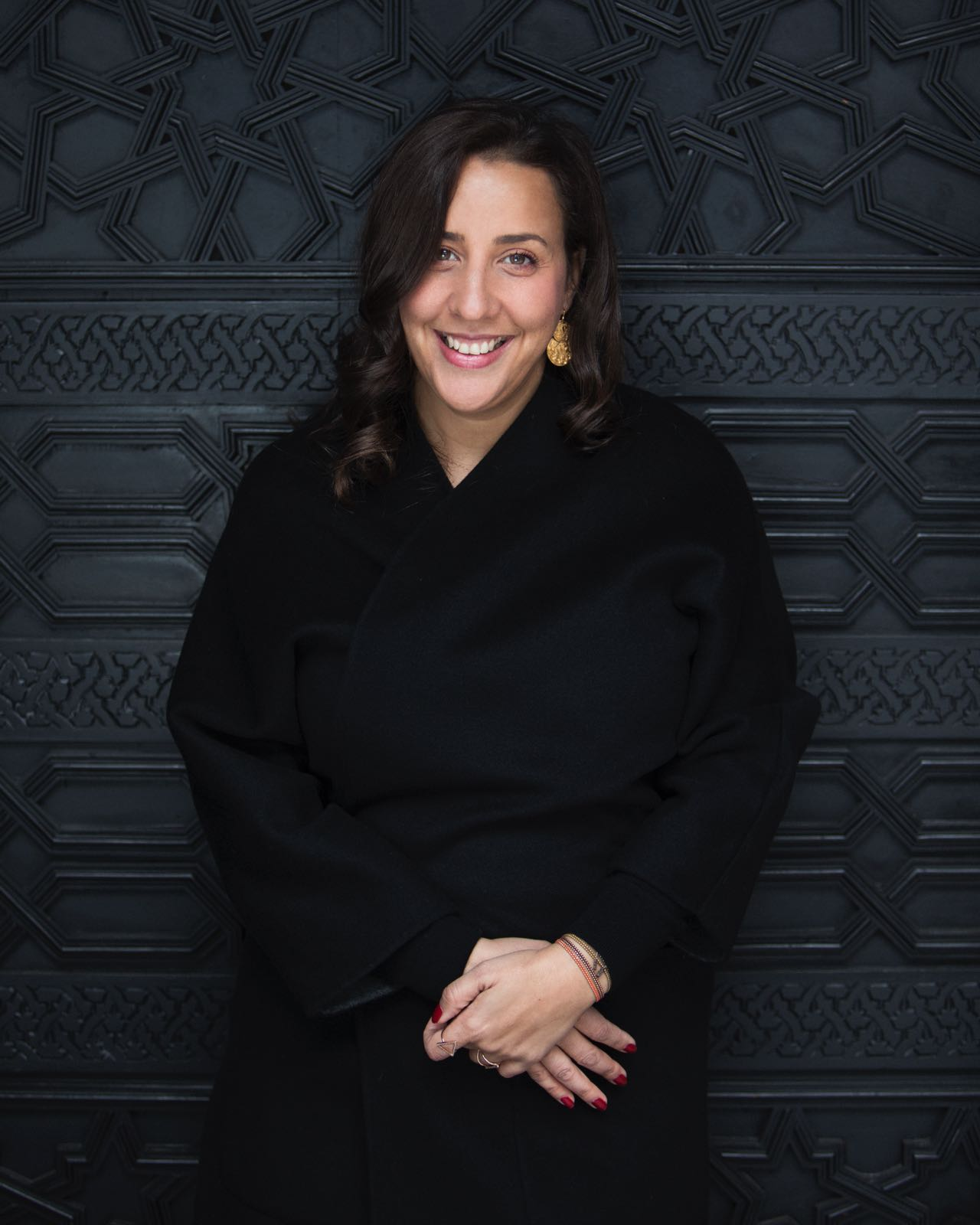
- Born: 1974 (age 51–52); Casablanca
- Education: Pace University
- Occupations: Entrepreneur, art dealer
- Known for: 1-54 Contemporary African Art Fair
- Parents: Hassan El Glaoui (father); Christine Legendre (mother)
- Relatives: Thami El Glaoui (grandfather) Mehdi El Glaoui (cousin) Muhammad al-Muqri (great grandfather)

Touria El Glaoui (Arabic: ثريا الكلاوي; born 1974) is a Franco-Moroccan entrepreneur, founding director of the 1-54 Contemporary African Art Fair, which is held every year in London, New York City and Marrakech. The fair, which draws its name from the 54 countries that make up the African continent, is dedicated to promoting the awareness and emergence of the contemporary African art market globally.

== Biography ==
Born in 1974 in Casablanca, she is the daughter of the painter Hassan El Glaoui and the Givenchy former model, Christine Legendre. She is also the granddaughter of Thami El Glaoui, Pasha of Marrakech, who played a significant political and military role in Morocco during the French protectorate.

She spent her childhood in Rabat, where she was educated at the Royal College. She then moved to New York City to study strategic management and international affairs at Pace University.

After her academic studies, she first worked for the investment bank Salomon Smith Barney in New York City, where she held the position of wealth management advisor, before moving to London in 2001 where she joined the Cisco Systems group. As part of this position, she was travelling between the African continent and the Middle East, where she deepened her curiosity and interest in their art and creators. During those years, she co-curated and organized exhibitions in London and Marrakech of her father's work and his relationship with Winston Churchill.

She resigned from her employment in 2013 to create 1-54 Contemporary African Art Fair. Its first edition was held in London in October 2013, at Somerset House. She then developed this fair in New York, where it has been held annually since 2015, and in Marrakesh, since 2018.

Through the years, Touria has chaired and spoken globally in several conferences and debates on contemporary African art and women in leadership at leading institutions. She is also on the Christie’s Education advisory board in London.

== Achievements ==
- Forbes listed her among the 100 most powerful women in Africa in 2016.
- Jeune Afrique listed her among the 50 most powerful women in Africa in 2015, 2018, 2019.
- New African magazine listed her among the 100 most influential Africans in business in 2013 and 2020.
- In October 2023, she was selected among 100 Femmes de Culture.

== Honours ==
- Knight of The Ordre des Arts et Des Lettres (September 2019 - France)
- Kennedy Center Honors, Gold Medal in the Arts (January 2023 - Washington, US)
