= Mehfil =

Formal venue for indoor recreational activities in South Asia

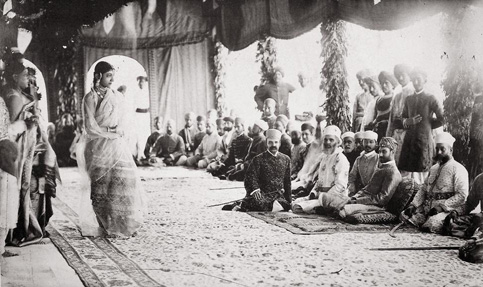
A Mehil-e-Mushaira at Hyderabad, in the presence of the courtiers

Mehfil or mahfil (Urdu: محفل), alternatively known as Bazm (Urdu: بزم) is a formal venue where indoor recreational activities such as poetic symposiums (mushaira), singing, music, and dance are entertained in parts of the Indian subcontinent. It is part of Ganga-Jamuni tehzeeb culture.

Historically, mehfils were presented in the homes or palaces of Muslim royalty or noblemen, who acted as these artists' patrons. Mehfils are also an integral part of the Hyderabadi Muslim community, and used as a way of unity among them, all around the world.

Today they are generally held in the homes of especially avid music lovers or the lovers of poetry-recitation gatherings. Ghazals are a common genre performed at mehfils. Ghazal recitation gatherings are called 'Mehfil-e-Mushaira' in the Urdu language.

== Etymology ==
The word mehfil derives from the Arabic word mehfil (Arabic: محفل), which means a (festive) "gathering to entertain (or praise someone)."

Tafsir-ul-Quran Mahfil is an event where people gather to discuss teaching of Quran and learn more about Islam.

Mehfil-e-Naat is an Islamic mehfil (forum) in which people sit and recite poetry in the praise of Muhammad.

Mehfil-e-Sama is a gathering held for Sufi devotional music such as Qawwali or prayer and chanting, Hadhra, part of Dhikr (remembrance of God).

== In popular culture ==
Several mehfil performances may be seen in the Satyajit Ray film Jalsaghar (1958). In recent times, live onstage concert performances are also called 'Mehfil'. "The word 'Mehfil' generally means a place where a music or dance-performance is in progress."

== See also ==
- Islamic poetry
- Urdu poetry
- Mawsim
- Tweeza
