= Ad Begum =

Indian tawaif

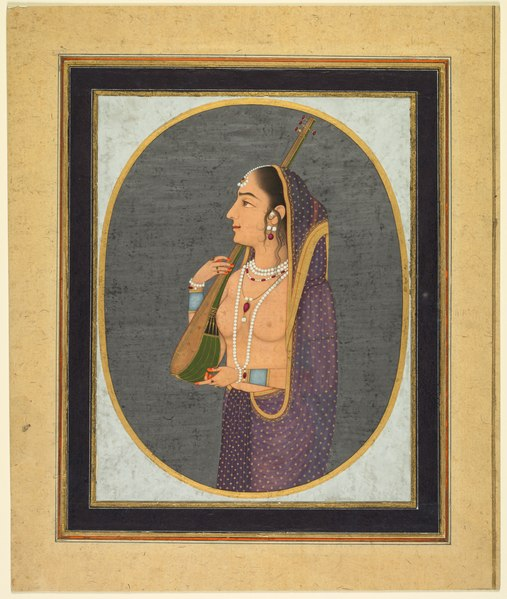
- Court lady singing and playing the veena, ca.1760 - possibly a depiction of Ad Bai.
- Born: Delhi, Mughal Empire
- Died: Shahjahanabad
- Period: Mughal Empire

Ad Bai, also known as Ad Begum, was an 18th-century Indian tawaif of Delhi. She was one of the most famed tawaifs during the reign of Mughal emperor Muhammad Shah.

== Life ==
Ad Bai was most likely born into a tawaif family, later pursuing the same profession. She was famous among the high echelons of the society of Shahjahanabad, which was a center of the arts and artists, most prominently tawaifs. She was one of the most famous tawaifs of the city, and was talked about as late as the 19th century.

She was known for her unique fashion. She would show up to the mehfils stark nude, her body skillfully and cleverly painted so that nobody would take notice. She would decorate her legs with beautifully drawn paijamas in the intricate naqqashi pattern, and in place of her cuffs she would draw on flowers and petals in ink "exactly as is found in the finest cloth of Rum." She would perform in sheer, highly diasphanous garments (such as peshwaz), without any clothes underneath.

According to Dargah Quli, the tawaifs of Shahjahanabad would observe a custom on the occasion of the Basant Festival (spring festival). All the dancers of the city would assemble at the grave of Azizi in Ahadipura and would then wash it with wine, and proceed to take their turns to dance. The tawaifs also displayed their skill at the Qadam Sharif in "the spirit of reverence on the occasion of this festival". Ad Bai most likely also participated in this custom.
