= Redemption Day (film) =

2021 American action thriller film

- Film poster
- Directed by: Hicham Hajji
- Written by: Lemore Syvan; Samy Chouia; Hicham Hajji
- Story by: Hicham Hajji
- Produced by: Hicham Hajji; David Zilberberg
- Starring: Gary Dourdan; Serinda Swan; Andy García; Brice Bexter; Ernie Hudson; Martin Donovan; Robert Knepper; Samy Naceri
- Cinematography: Philip Lozano
- Edited by: Karim Ouaret
- Music by: Sacha Chaban
- Production companies: Voltage Pictures; H Films; Buffalo 8 Productions
- Distributed by: Saban Films
- Release date: January 8, 2021 (United States)
- Running time: 99 minutes
- Country: United States
- Languages: English; French

Redemption Day is a 2021 American action thriller film directed and co-written by Hicham Hajji. The film stars Gary Dourdan, Serinda Swan, Andy García, Martin Donovan, Robert Knepper and Samy Naceri and follows the U.S. Marine who travels to Morocco to rescue his kidnapped wife. It was distributed by Saban Films.

== Plot ==
U.S. Marine Corps Captain Brad Paxton is living with his wife Kate, an archeologist, and a daughter in New York City. He is still haunted by the nightmare of his service in Syria. After giving a speech at a conference, Kate travels to Morocco for an archaeological mission, where she meets French-Algerian archaeologist Jean Rashidi. When Kate and her team drive to find an ancient city hidden under the desert, they realize that they have inadvertently crossed the border into Algeria. Local insurgents arrive and kidnap Kate, Jean and Moroccan Amir Jadid. Jadid is released later.

Brad receives news about Kate and travels to Rabat, where he meets a Cabinet member of the Moroccan government, a liaison Younes Laalej, a former U.S. Army soldier, served together with Brad. U.S. Ambassador Williams reluctantly agrees to join Younes and Brad in the operation to gather intel, despite Tom Fitzgerald's objections. The embassy discloses that the terrorist leader Jaafar El Hadi is wanted by Interpol and has been in hiding. Meanwhile, El Hadi and his comrades vote to kill Kate if the ten million dollar ransom is not paid after their evening prayer.

With the help of the counter-terrorism agency, they manage to track the whereabouts to El Hadi's compound in Abadla. Brad and Younes embark the hour-long drive there. After Younes sends the coordinates of the compound, Williams asks the U.S. President to send Navy SEALs to assist them in the operation. At night, Brad and Younes manage to kill most of the men, and Brad finds and hides Kate. The terrorists kill Jean after the French government fails to pay the ransom. When the two are confronted by El Hadi, he forces Younes to order the government to transfer the $10 million ransom into El Hadi's offshore account. As El Hadi attempts to escape, the SEALs arrive and kill El Hadi and his remaining men. Before leaving, Brad and Younes blow up the compound but are incapacitated; presuming that they are dead, the SEALs rescue Kate and fly away.

The next day, Brad reunites with Kate at the Algeria–Morocco border. Later, Jadid meets Fitz, who compliments the former's bravery and grants him American citizenship and status as a CIA asset. However, Jadid is killed on his way out, revealing that Fitz is a lobbyist for the oil company which also finances the terrorist networks. Fitz also presumes that Brad and Younes were killed in action. As he and his associates exit the building, Younes spies on them and texts Brad of their corruption.

== Cast ==
- Gary Dourdan as Captain Brad Paxton
- Serinda Swan as Kate Paxton
- Andy García as Ambassador Williams
- Brice Bexter as Younes Laalej
- Ernie Hudson as Ed Paxton
- Martin Donovan as Tom Fitzgerald
- Robert Knepper as Mysterious Oil Lobbyist
- Samy Naceri as Jaafar El Hadi
- Yassine Azzouz as Amir Jadid
- Lilia Hajji as Clair Paxton
- Brahim Rachiki as Jean Rashidi

== Reception ==
On review aggregator Rotten Tomatoes, the film holds an approval rating of 14% based on 21 reviews, with an average rating of 3.5/10. Metacritic, which uses a weighted average, assigned the film a score of 22 out of 100, based on 5 critics, indicating "generally unfavorable".

Joe Leydon of Variety gave it a negative review: "If 'Redemption Day' were any more generic, the first thing you'd see on screen would be a bar code in place of the opening credits."
