= Mawsim =

Annual regional festival in Maghreb countries

Mawsim or moussem (Arabic: موسم), waada, or raqb, is the term used in the Maghreb to designate an annual regional festival in which worshippers usually combine the religious celebration of local Marabouts or Sufi Tariqas, with various festivities and commercial activities. These are very popular events, often attended by people from very distant places.

== Etymology ==
=== Mawsim, moussem ===
Mawsim (pl. mawāsim) is an Arabic word literally meaning "season of, time of". It comes from the root w-s-m "to mark".

=== Waada ===
The origin of the name waada comes from the word waad meaning "meeting" and "gathering".

=== Raqb ===
The name raqb indicates the pedestrian and equestrian procession of the murids (novices) from all sides towards the place of the customary or ritual festival.

== Religious and secular origin ==
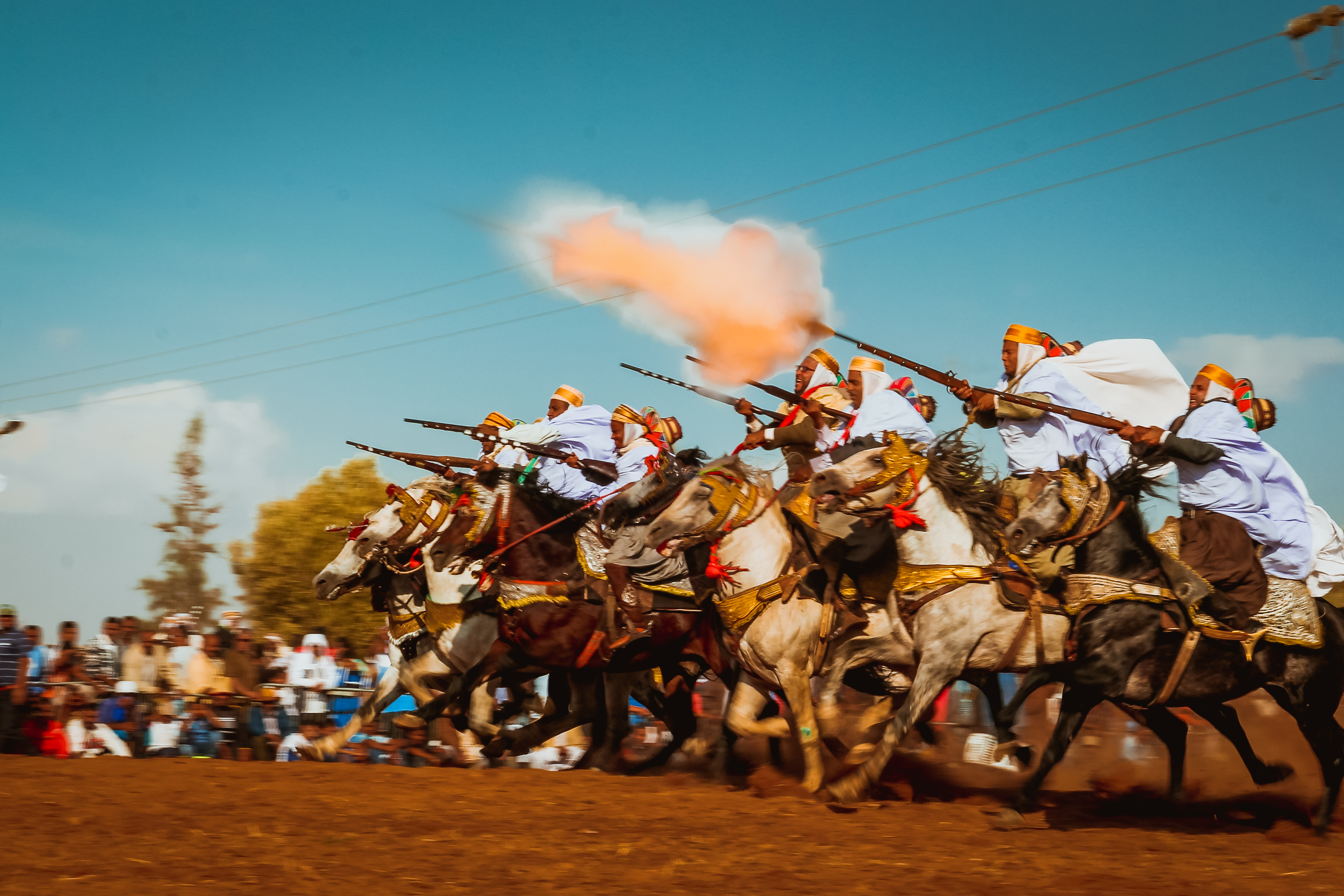
Fantasia in Algeria

A mawsim is an originally religiously motivated festival pilgrimage in the Maghreb in honor of a saint (typically called by an honorific such as sheikh, sidi or mulay). Mawāsim are cultural events linked to the harvest, to Sufi saints, or to nature, so these local festivals are both religious and secular.

The mawsim at Nabi Musa in Jericho, the most important festival for Muslim Palestinians, took place in spring, a season used for popular holidays since classical antiquity.

== Religious and social practices ==
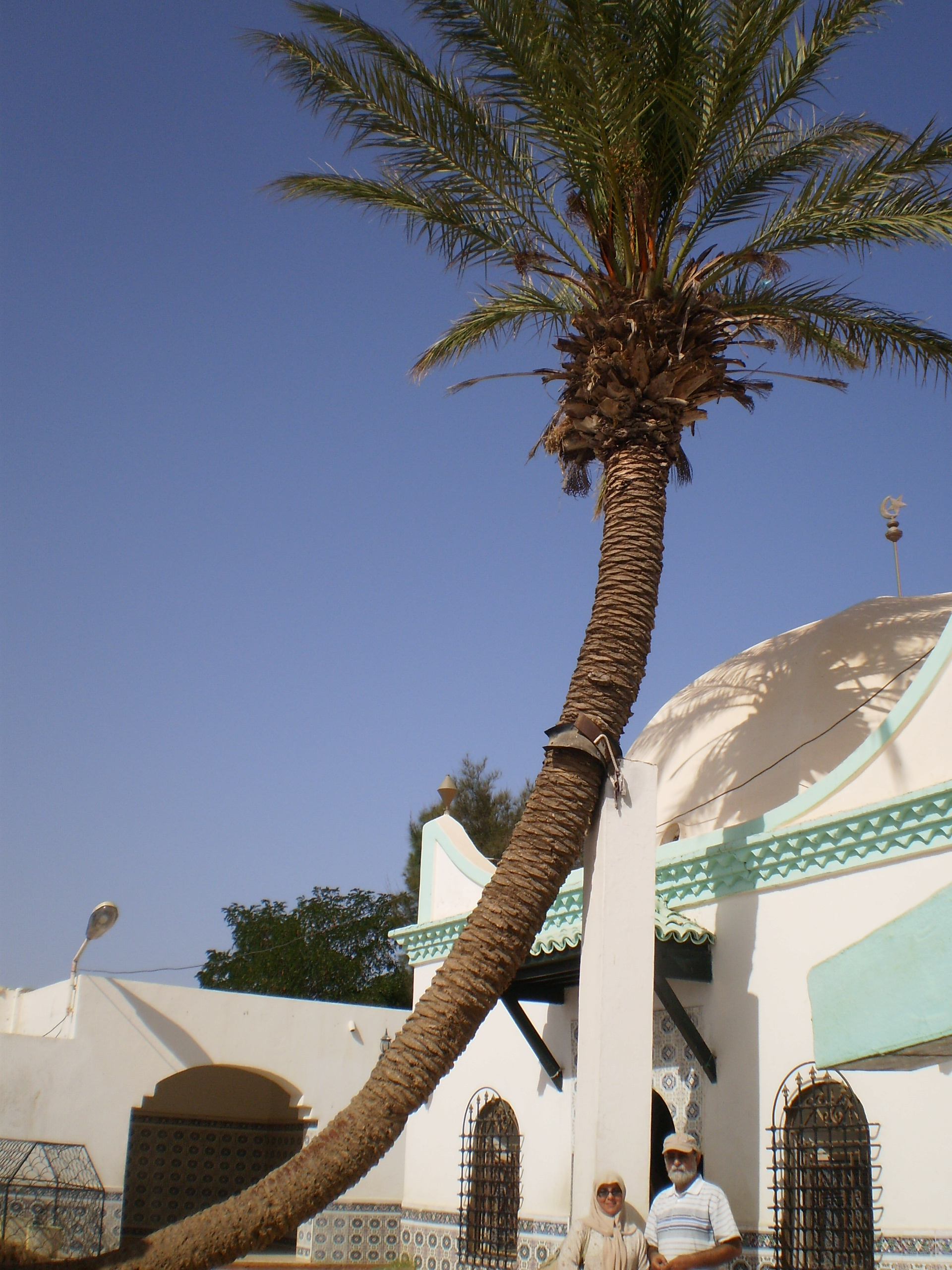
Mausoleum of Sidi Lakhdar Ben Khlouf

In the Berber areas of the Maghreb, almost every village had its saint or marabout and a small domed tomb or mausoleum (qubba) of the same name. This feast or ritual of the marabout is celebrated once a year and worshipers come to it from places far away. Some marabout buildings are still being maintained and whitewashed with white paint every few years.

Many do not really have a link to a saint or founder, but are annual regional meetings designated for a social or economic purpose.

The religious practices relating to the mawsim are based on the tilawa (ritual recitation) of the complete and integral sixty hizbs of the Quran, the Sufi salka.

A collective recitation of the al-Burda poem adorns the festivities to praise Prophet Muhammad before the start of the Mawlid (Prophet's birthday) celebration and before visiting his tomb in the Prophet's Mosque in Medina.

Collective catering around large couscous dishes is a central quality of these festivities in order to socialize people attending the mawsim around traditional culinary foods in addition to the recitation of the Quran, Dhikr and Qasidas.

The annual gathering of the descendants of the marabout in this festivity is an opportunity to strengthen family and tribal ties between these cousins, and also to establish family alliances with other siblings and tribes.

These religious, sociological and gastronomic aspects make it possible to weld the cultural and existential breaches of patriarchal societies and to preserve the intangible heritage of populations, especially rural ones.

Group salah (prayer), collective tarteel, team tasting of dishes and couscous, choral singing of Al-Burda, appreciation of the artistic performances of fantasia, humming of poems and qasidas, as well as other activities, make mawsim a proven factor of social cohesion and individual appeasement.

== Date ==
The religiously related festivals are often based on the Islamic calendar and thus take place in different hijri months each year changing.

== Equestrian games; prominent moussems ==
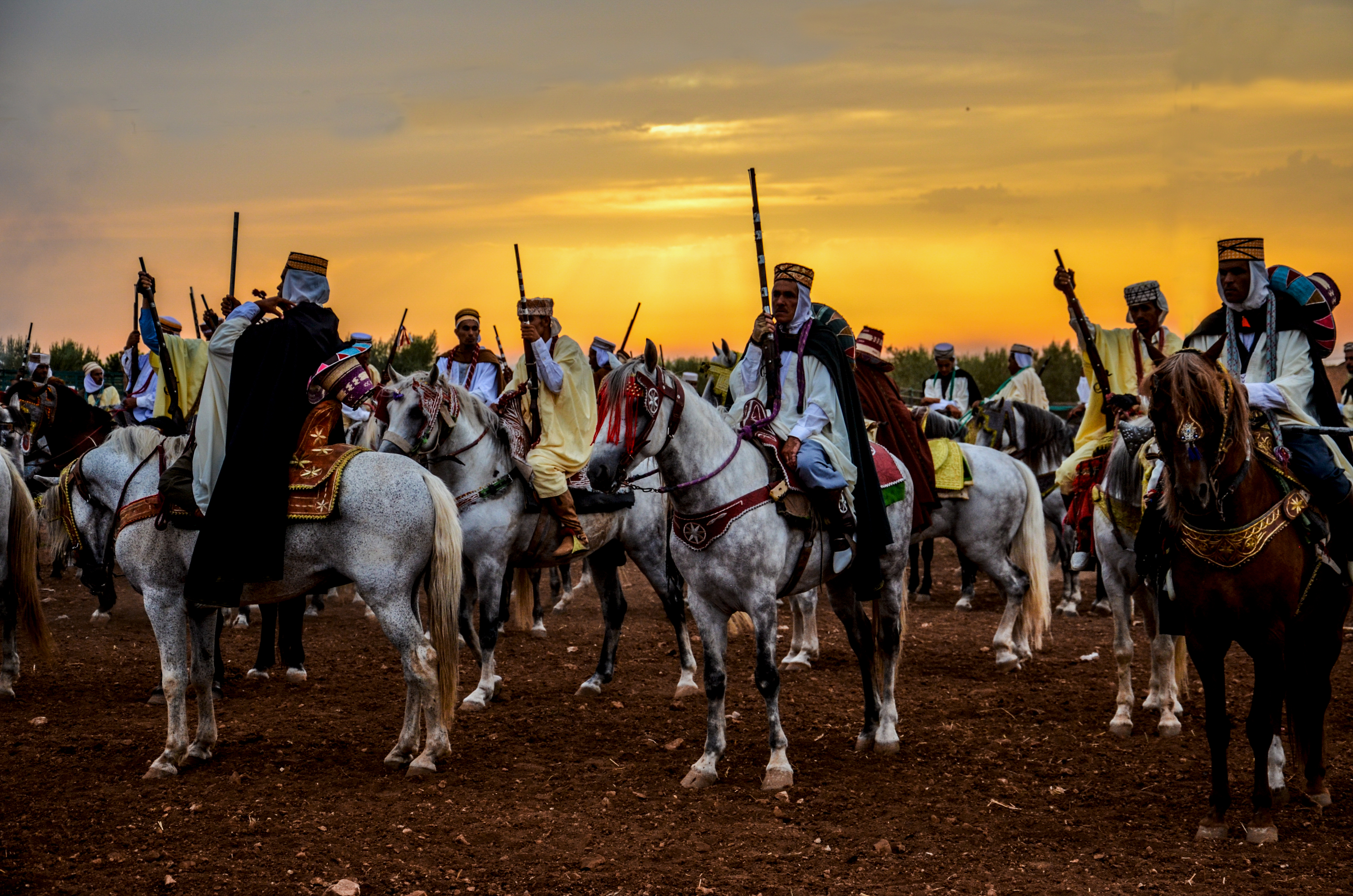
Fantasia in Algeria

A mawsim is sometimes accompanied by the equestrian games called Fantasias and other cultural peculiarities. Mawāsim and Fantasias include equestrian games as a tradition of regional pilgrimages linked to one another in Islamic times.

Many of the Algerian fantasia troupes perform horse exhibition shown several times a year in different cultural Mawāsim such as that of Sidi Ahmed al-Majzub in Naâma, the Horse celebration of Tiaret, or the Celebration of Sidi Yahia Bensafia in Tlemcen.

The most important Algerian mawsimis that of the oasis of Béni Abbès in the region of Bechar.

Tan-Tan Moussem is a traditional annual gathering of Berber tribes from the Maghreb in the southwest Moroccan town of Tan-Tan. A mawsim is "a type of annual fair with economic, cultural and social functions."

== See also ==
- Hajj, annual Islamic pilgrimage to Mecca
- Islamic saint or wali
- Sebiba, Ashura Festival event and dance of the Algerian Tuaregs with black African roots
- Tweeza, Algerian Sufi term for voluntary cooperation in doing a good deed for individuals or communities
- Wezeea, Algerian term for a rural Sufi cultural custom
- Zawiyas in Algeria, Sufi religious buildings honouring the memory of patron saints
- Ziyarat, pilgrimage to venerated Islamic sites
