= Brice Bexter =

Actor known for Miss Fisher and Redemption

- Born: 25 July 1990 (age 36); Lausanne, Switzerland
- Education: Regent's University London; University College London
- Years active: 2017–present
- Family: Hassan El Glaoui (grandfather); Thami El Glaoui (great-grandfather)

Brice Bexter (born 25 July 1990) is an actor. His films include Miss Fisher and the Crypt of Tears (2020) and Redemption Day (2021). He was named a 2020 Screen International Arab Star of Tomorrow.

== Early life and education ==
Bexter was born in Lausanne, Switzerland to a French-Moroccan mother and a British father with paternal Czech-Jewish roots. He is the grandson of painter Hassan El Glaoui, and the great grandson of Pasha Thami El Glaoui. Bexter and his brother grew up in Rabat with their grandparents. He attended the French school Lycée Descartes, where he participated in theatre.

In 2007, at the age of 17, Bexter worked as stand-in on the set of Ridley Scott's Body of Lies. The following year, he worked as an extra on the set of the film Green Zone. After completing his baccalaureate, He graduated with a Bachelor of Arts from Regent's University London in 2013 and a Master of Science from University College London (UCL) in 2016, both in Management.

== Career ==
In 2018, Bexter was cast as Captain Templeton in the 1920s-set Australian mystery film Miss Fisher and the Crypt of Tears, a spinoff of the ABC series Miss Fisher's Murder Mysteries and adaptation of the novels by Kerry Greenwood. The film premiered at the 2020 Palm Springs International Film Festival and had a theatrical release later that year. Bexter also appeared in the independent film Greetings from ISIS opposite Ouidad Elma.

Bexter went on to star as ambassador and counter-terrorism agent Younes Laalej in the 2021 action thriller film Redemption Day alongside Gary Dourdan, Serinda Swan, and Andy Garcia. This was followed by further film roles in the biopic Fatema, La Sultane Inoubliable as well as The Moderator in 2022.

== Filmography ==
=== Film ===
Year	Title	Role	Notes
2017	Carlos Gustavo	Justin	
2017	Leaving Legacy	Kaiss	Short film
2018	L'effort d'Aimer	Jéam	Short film
2019	Greetings from ISIS	Abu Youssef	
2020	Miss Fisher and the Crypt of Tears	Captain Templeton	
2021	Redemption Day	Younes Laalej	
2022	Fatema, La Sultane Inoubliable	Mohamed	
2022	The Moderator	Jawad	
2023	Seneca – On the Creation of Earthquakes		
2024	Mary	Aristobulus IV	
2024	The Wound	Adam	
2024	A Song for Juliette	Mephistopheles	
2025	Better Days	Amin	
2025	Rule Breakers	Professor	
2025	Atoman	Mokhtar	
2025	The Lost Princess	Omar	
TBA	Dancing in the Wind	Oliver Miller	

=== Television ===
Year	Title	Role	Notes
2019	Good Omens	Secret Service Agent	Episode: "In the Beginning"
2022	The Eight	Miller	Episode: "Adnan Al Kayal"
2023	Ghosts of Beirut	Topher	Miniseries, 1 episode
2024	The New Look	FBI Officer	Episode: "What a Difference"
2024	Les Espions de la terreur	Doug	Miniseries, 1 episode
2024	Jesus: Crown of Thorns	Young Man	Episode: "This Kingdom is Ours"
2026	Young Sherlock	Folies Bergère Guard	Episode: "The Case of the Killing Jar"
TBA	Glow & Darkness	Humphrey of Toron	Series
