= Hassan El Glaoui =

Moroccan figurative painter (1923-2018)

- Born: December 23, 1923; Marrakesh, Morocco
- Died: June 21, 2018 (aged 94); Rabat, Morocco
- Education: École nationale supérieure des beaux-arts (ENSBA)
- Occupation: Painter
- Known for: Figurative painting
- Parents: Thami El Glaoui (father); Lalla Zineb El Mokri daughter of Mohamed El Mokri Grand Vizir (mother)
- Website: www.hassanelglaoui.com

Hassan El Mezouari El Glaoui (1923–2018) was a Moroccan figurative painter best known for his depictions of fantasia horsemen.

== Early life ==
El Glaoui was born in Marrakesh, Morocco, on December 23, 1923, to the last Pasha of Marrakesh, Thami El Glaoui. The artist credited British Prime Minister Winston Churchill with convincing his powerful father to let him pursue painting as a career, particularly after a 1943 meeting when the Pasha sought and received Churchill's opinion of his son's paintings.

== Career ==
In 1950 actor Edward G. Robinson, his wife Gladys Lloydand Robison (art collector and a painter) and Sir Anson Goodyear (one of the founders of the Museum of Modern Art in New York) were invited by their friend and politician Thami El Glaoui to Marrakesh. During their short trip to Morocco, they had the pleasure to meet with Hassan and seeing some of his work. Impressed by the talent of the young artist, they convinced the Pacha to let him present in Paris and New York in 1951 for the first time alongside Gladys Lloydand Robison's paintings. Both exhibitions were successes and Hassan was allowed to study abroad.

Beginning in the early 1950s, El Glaoui trained in Paris at the École des Beaux-Arts under Jean Souverbie and Émilie Charmy. During his time in Paris he mastered drawing and oil paintings and was the first Moroccan artist to study art abroad.

He married a Frenchwoman of Egyptian origin, Évelyne Kahil. In 1954, he was injured in an automobile accident with his wife in Aix-les-Bains.

He was an heir to a 300-year-old dynasty of Berbers. Following his father's death in 1956 shortly after the independence of Morocco, his family's wealth was confiscated for a year. During a stay in Marrakech on May 1, 1957, he was kidnapped with three of his brothers by (a priori uncontrolled elements of Istiqlal), and remained detained for more than 18 months in different locations. The last location was near Casablanca in Boucheron.

He decided to exile himself back to Paris after his liberation in late 1958. His first wife soon filed for divorce. He moved to an exentred place near the castle of Rambouillet, where he lived alone. He met his second wife Christine Legendre, a model for Hubert de Givenchy. They got married in Brussels in 1963.

The artist was widely exhibited in Europe and the United States, among other places at the time, and his work auctioned by Sotheby's and Christie's.

In 1964 he moved back to Morocco to be closer to his mother. In 1965 his first show since his return to Morocco was held in a large tent.

His paintings follow the Moroccan figurative tradition, and his main subjects are military horses and their riders. He rose to prominence in the 1980s with his modernist figurative paintings of fantasia horsemen landscapes and unique portrait. He held solo shows in Paris (1950), New York (1951, 1967), London (1960), Brussels (1969), and Casablanca, and his works are collected in the Royal Palace Collection in Fez, Morocco, and the Parliament Collection in Rabat. During his first show in New York, he stood out in his djellaba and retaining his polite demeanor.

El Glaoui's works were appreciated by Moroccan Kings Hassan II and Mohamed VI.

== Death and legacy ==
El Glaoui died on June 21, 2018, in Rabat, aged 94.

In early 2012, El Glaoui's work was exhibited alongside Churchill's Moroccan paintings of Marrakech, as proposed by El Glaoui's daughter and curated by Daniel Robbins at the London Leighton House Museum. The 2014 Marrakesh Biennale also showed the pairing. His children are also in the fine arts industry. Touria El Glaoui started the contemporary African art fair 1:54, and Ghizlan El Glaoui paints in a mosaic style. His grandson Brice Bexter is a rising actor.

African art broke records at Sotheby's on April 2, 2019. Among the record-breaking works was La Sortie du Roi by Hassan El Glaoui, which sold for 137.500 £.

Later in April 2019 the family organized with the MMVI a show with more than hundred unique paintings call "The Salt of my Earth" to showcase unique artwork unknown to the public. The exhibition attracted more than 32 000 visitors in less than three months.
