= Athi-Patra Ruga =

South African artist (born 1984)

- Born: March 9, 1984 (age 42); Umtata, South Africa
- Education: Belgravia Art Centre, 2001. Gordon Flack Davison Design Academy, 2004.
- Known for: Performance, Painting, Tapestry, Mixed Media
- Spouse: Malibongwe Tyilo
- Awards: Standard Bank Young Artist for Performance 2015, Malick Sedibe Prize for Photography, 8th Ruth Baumgarte Art Award

Athi-Patra Ruga (born in 1984) is a South African artist who uses performance, photography, video, textiles, and printmaking to explore notions of utopia and dystopia, material and memory. His work explores the body in relation to sensuality, culture, and ideology, often creating cultural hybrids. Themes such as sexuality, Xhosa culture, and the place of queerness within post-apartheid South Africa also permeate his work.

== Early life and education ==
Athi-Patra Ruga was born on 9 March 1984 in Umtata in Eastern Cape, South Africa. He studied fashion history and design at the Gordon Flack Davison Design Academy in Johannesburg.

Ruga was included in the book Younger Than Jesus (2019), a directory of over 500 of the world's best artists under the age of 33. In 2014 he presented in collaboration with Zanele Muholi and Nandipha Mntambo, at the Design Indaba Conference at Cape Town. In 2018, Ruga had an exhibition at the 1-54 art fair in London entitled House, Of Gods, Rainbows and Omissions. Ruga's work has been purchased by numerous public and private collections, including the Zeitz Museum of Contemporary Art Africa permanent collection, Iziko South African National Gallery, Museion – Museum of Modern and Contemporary Art, in Bolzano Italy, and the CAAC – Pigozzi Collection.

== Style and philosophy ==
Ruga explores the notions of utopia and dystopia of a post apartheid South Africa. Working in printmaking, textiles, fashion, performance, and video, his work explores the body in relation to sensuality, culture, and ideology, often creating cultural hybrids. Themes such as sexuality, HIV/AIDS, African culture, and the place of queerness within post-apartheid South Africa also permeate his work. Ruga uses queerness to delineate appropriate symbols of apartheid's power structure of strict binaries of gender and race and make them more ambiguous. To engage with his work the audiences need to be open, to experience and share. Ruga's performance pieces often raising questions about the public spaces being engaged with, exploring diverse levels of perceptions and reactions of the population encountered. Using fashion and body language in relation to the urban spaces provide a clash between legal and individual freedoms and social norms. Engaging in behaviors that lack a sense of "normalcy" or "common sense" using parameters such as gender, ways of moving, dress and behavior, race and ethnicity in a hetero normative society.

== Notable works ==
=== Future White Women of Azania (FWWoA, 2010–2016) ===
FWWoA consists of several works, including performance, tapestry, sculpture, video, and photography creating a saga. FWWoA is an allegory of post apartheid nationalism, where Ruga then becomes the "elder" or historian. Creating this constellationary history, drawing references from pre Xhosa history and post apartheid South Africa, tells the history of the non-dynastic line of queens who rule the lands of Azania. Ruga's works are attentive to the demands for justice for his ancestors and the need for radical transformation in the future, to shatter the ideologies of "rainbowism". By using Azania as the framework for a critical history of South Africa, FWWoA reveals the silencing of black voices that extends back to the first moments of colonial contact, while also addressing the impossible and unrealized ideologies of forgiveness, reconciliation and redemption practiced in a post apartheid South African.

Azania's allegorical capacity derives from its status as a symbol of a liberated South Africa during the anti-apartheid struggle. However, the term has a specific history that complicates such dreams. The place name 'Azania' first appears in The Periplus of the Erythraean Sea (40 AD) to refer to the lands of southern and eastern Africa. By designating the lands of Africa as 'Azania,' Ruga understands the label as one example in a long history of constructing Africa as uninhabited until European colonial contact.

Ruga's tapestries in the FWWoA saga chronicles allegorical depictions of queens, maps, and other iconography of Azania. The struggles of the non-dynastic line of queens depicting signifiers of an Azanian national identity: national seal, crest, flower, maps, while also including Ruga's long standing interest in popular culture. Taking inspirations from Gustave Eiffel's 'Statue of Liberty' or Eugène Delacroix's 'Liberty Leading the People', Ruga brings about the idea of objectifying the woman's body as the conflict, but in his own work creates them as powerful but passive. In his work 'The Lands of Azania', Ruga reworks the map of Eastern Africa. Insetting a national animal, the saber-tooth zebra, the Azanian flag, and giving several countries new names. Throughout the geography of Azania he further explores the overlaps of exile and diaspora in the African and Jewish communities.

A narrative with five characters, a national flower, crest and animal including the rainbow coloured balloon characters. One of Ahti-Patra's goals was to make a myth accessible even for children. A cute figure that has the capacity to be festive, create fanfare yet become disquieting when it violently pops and bleeds.

=== Performance Obscura ===
Performance Obscura, is a performance piece as part of the saga The Future White Women of Azania (FWWoA, 2010–2016) in which an obscured figure in bright pink tights and red stiletto heels covered from the waist up in brightly colored balloons confronts everyday life. Ruga is confronting public memory, national identity, and history in post-apartheid South Africa, while combining traditions like a funeral march and hybrid and festive Kaapse Klopse minstrel parade in Cape Town. The balloons representing lightness, flotation and childhood joy, while also referencing Desmond Tutu's metaphor of rainbow nation. The performers actions of bursting the balloons and leaving dye on it undermines the authoritative powers of the statues there by disestablishing the authority of stone. Ruga terms these characters as "avatars" and serves an apotropaic function by shielding the performer from trauma and empowering them.

=== The Naivete of Beiruth (2007) ===
This series of photographs are centered around Johannesburg Central Police Station, called John Vorster Square during apartheid, associated with interrogations, torture, and killing of political prisoners before 1994. Ruga dressed his subject in women's clothing along with a black helmet and long-haired wig. The extravagant garments and dramatic and glamorous poses evoke traditional fashion photography, contrasting with the racist crimes once committed in the building. Among other motivations to produce this work, the artist mentioned the xenophobic attacks that took place in May 2008 (called 5/11 in the vernacular) in townships all over South Africa as well as in the inner city of Johannesburg.

=== Ilulwane ===
Ilulwane was a synchronized-swimming performance inspired by Alvin Baltrop's 1970s and '80s photographs, reflecting on the passage of time in both New York and in the artist's own Xhosa culture. Ilulwane was performed in Cape Town at the Long Street Baths during the Infecting the City Public Arts Festival in 2012

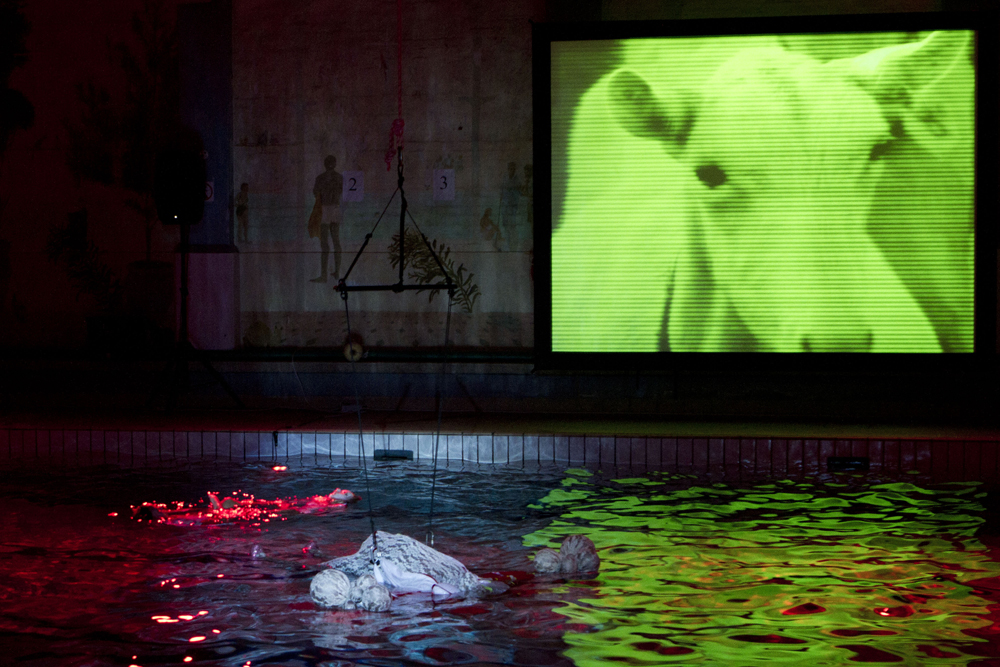
Infecting The City 2012, Ilulwane

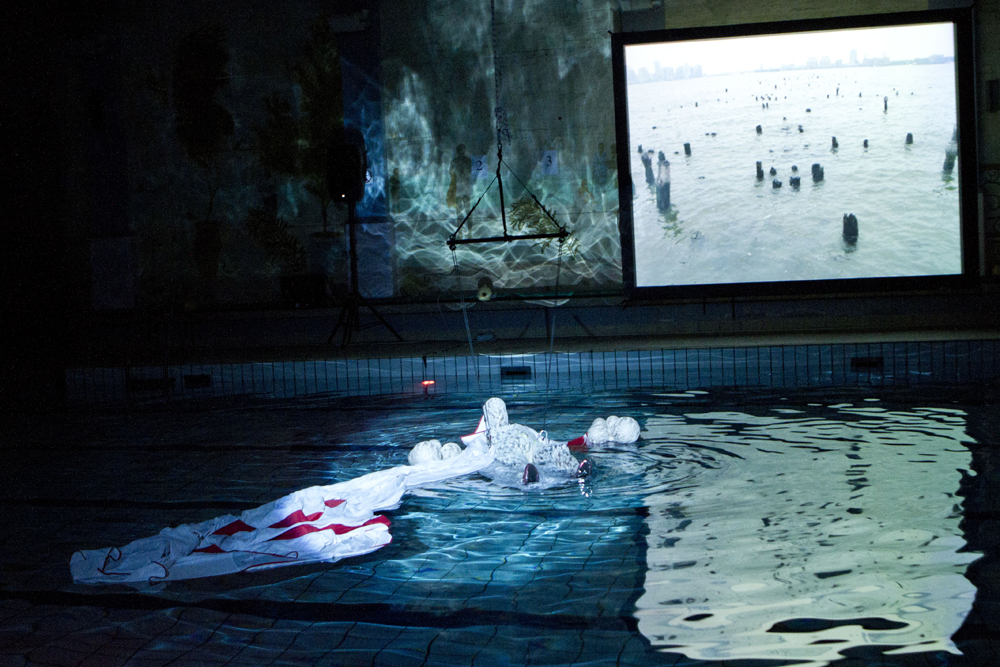
Infecting The City 2012, Ilulwane

=== ...ellipsis in three parts ===
...ellipsis in three parts is a performance that took place in the Michaelis Galleries at the University of Cape Town with three female performers on three separate days. The artist and performers were covered in body paint and as they wrestled across the gallery walls, they created the print as a record of the live performance. Thus Ruga involves his body directly into the printmaking process.

== Career ==
=== Exhibitions ===
2025

- Narratives in Focus: Selections from PAMM's Collection, Pérez Art Museum Miami, Florida

2018

- Armory Show 2018 – Pier 94, New York

2017

- Queens in Exile (2014–2017) – WHATIFTHEWORLD, Cape Town

2016

- Athi-Patra Ruga, Bass Museum of Art, Miami
- Re(as)sisting Narratives, Framer Framed, Amsterdam

2015

- A Land Without A People...For A People Without A Land, In Situ, Paris
- The Elder Of Azania, Grahamstown National Arts Festival, Grahamstown

2014

- Uncertain Terms – WHATIFTHEWORLD, Cape Town
- African Odysseys, Espace culturel Louis Vuitton, Paris, France
- PRÓXIMO FUTURO / NEXT FUTURE, Programa Gulbenkian de Cultura Contemporânea, Lisbon, Portugal
- Public Intimacy, SFMOMA, San Francisco
- Brave New World...20 Years of Democracy, IZIKO South African National Gallery, Cape Town
- The Future White Women of Azania Saga – WHATIFTHEWORLD, Cape Town

2013

- Between the Lines, Braunschweig University of Art, Berlin
- Making Way: Contemporary Art from South Africa and China, Standard Bank Gallery, Johannesburg
- Imaginary Fact, 55th La Biennale di Venezia, South African Pavilion, Venice
- The Beautiful Ones, Galerie Nolan Judin, Berlin
- Films for Peace, Screened Worldwide including South Africa, Paris, London, New York, Sydney
- Sharp Sharp, Johannesburg, Gaite Lyrique, Paris

2012

- Making Way, in collaboration with Mikhael Subotzky, National Arts Festival, Grahamstown
- Under a Tinsel Sun, The III Moscow International Biennale For Young Art, Moscow, Russia
- Neither Man Nor Stone, IZIKO South African National Gallery, Cape Town
- Ilulwane, solo presentation at Long Street Baths, Cape Town
- A SHOT IN THE ARSE, The Michaelis Gallery, Cape Town

2011

- BECOMING: Photographs from the Wedge Collection, Nasher Museum of Art, North Carolina, US
- Solo Presentation at VOLTA New York City, New York
- A Tribute to Photography, Primo Marella Gallery, Milan, Italy
- Living as Form Exhibition, New York
- Ilulwane – solo presentation at Performa 11, New York City, New York

2010

- From Pierneef to Gugulective, South African National Gallery, Cape Town
- Athi-Patra Ruga – The Works, Solo Exhibition FRED Gallery, London, England
- For Those Who Live in It – Pop culture Politics and Strong Voices, MU Foundation, Eindhoven, The Netherlands
- DADA South, South African National Gallery, Cape Town
- X HOMES – Performance Art Series, Johannesburg
- The Body In Question IV: La Momma Morta, Solo Exhibition, YOUNG BLACKMAN, Cape Town]
- Africa, Assume Art Position!, Primo Marella Gallery, Milan, Italy

2009

- A Life Less Ordinary; Performance and Display in South African Art, Djanogly Art Gallery, Nottingham, United Kingdom. [Cat]
- After He Left, Solo Exhibition, YOUNG BLACKMAN, Cape Town
- ... Mister Floating Signifier and the Deadboyz – Solo Exhibition, Whatiftheworld, Cape Town
- Beauty and Pleasure in Contemporary South African Art, Stenersen Museet, Oslo, Norway
- Infecting the city, Cape Town CBD, South Africa
- Spot on Dak'Art – 2008 Retrospective, IFA Gallery, Berlin, Germany
- Pret a Partager (More than the sum of its parts), IFA Gallery, Stuttgart, Germany
- Big Wednesday – Whatiftheworld Gallery, Cape Town, South Africa

2008

- Peripheral Vision and Collective Body, Museum of Modern and Contemporary Art, Bolzano, Italy
- Big Wednesday, Whatiftheworld Gallery, Cape Town, South Africa
- ...of bugchasers and watusi faghags (Solo Exhibition), Art Extra, Johannesburg, South Africa
- Disguise: The art of attracting and deflecting attention, Michael Stevenson Gallery, Cape Town, South Africa
- Upstairs/Downstairs, Association of Visual Arts, Cape Town, South Africa
- The Trickster, Art Extra, Johannesburg, South Africa

2007

- Impossible Monsters, Art Extra, Johannesburg, South Africa.
- Miss Congo, Performance in collaboration with Christopher Martin, Confluence 4.2, DesignIndaba 10
- "She is dancing in the Rain with her hand in the toaster", Performance in collaboration with Christopher Martin, Michael Stevenson Contemporary, Cape Town, South Africa
- Inj'ibhabha Series, Jaundiced Arcadia / Tales of Counterpenetration, Progr zentrum fur kulturproduction, Bern, Switzerland.

2006

- Doc. no3, Die Naai Masjien – Miss Congo, Kinshasa, Democratic Republic of Congo

2005

- Doc. no2, Die Naai Masjien- The Revenge of the 9 ft Ma-Benz and her Toothless Taxi Kings, Elle New Talent Awards / South African Fashion Week.

2004

- Doc. no1, Die Naai Masjien – Familie Fortuin, Elle New Talent Awards / South African Fashion Week

=== Residencies ===
2007

- A.I.R., PROGR – Zentrum fur Kulturproduction. Bern, Switzerland.
- Kin Be Jozi. August House, Johannesburg, South Africa

2006

- Scenographies Urbaines. Lingwala, Kinshasa, D.R.C.
