= Fantasia (performance) =

Traditional exhibition in the Maghreb

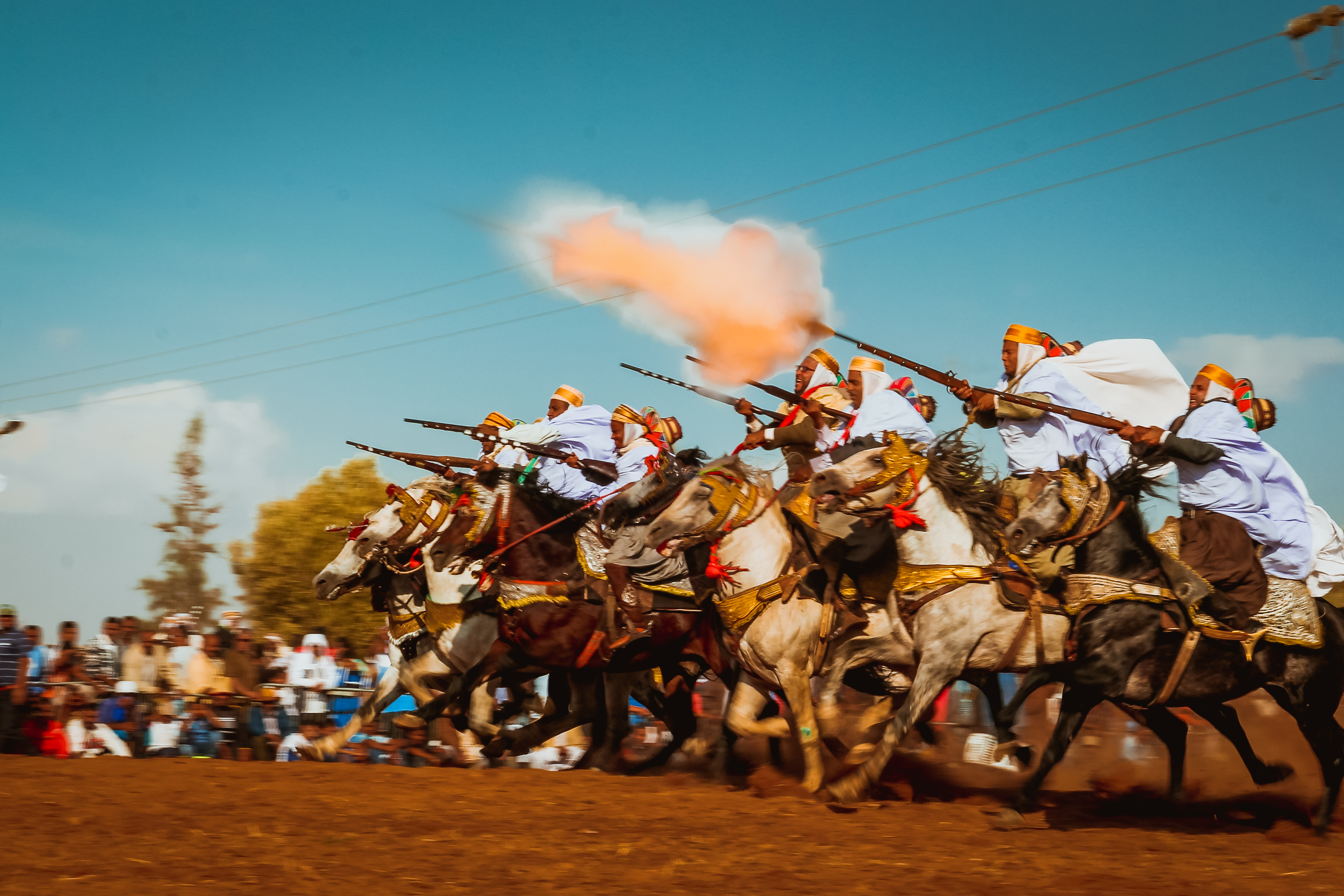
Fantasia at Aïn El Arbaa (Aïn Témouchent, Algeria).

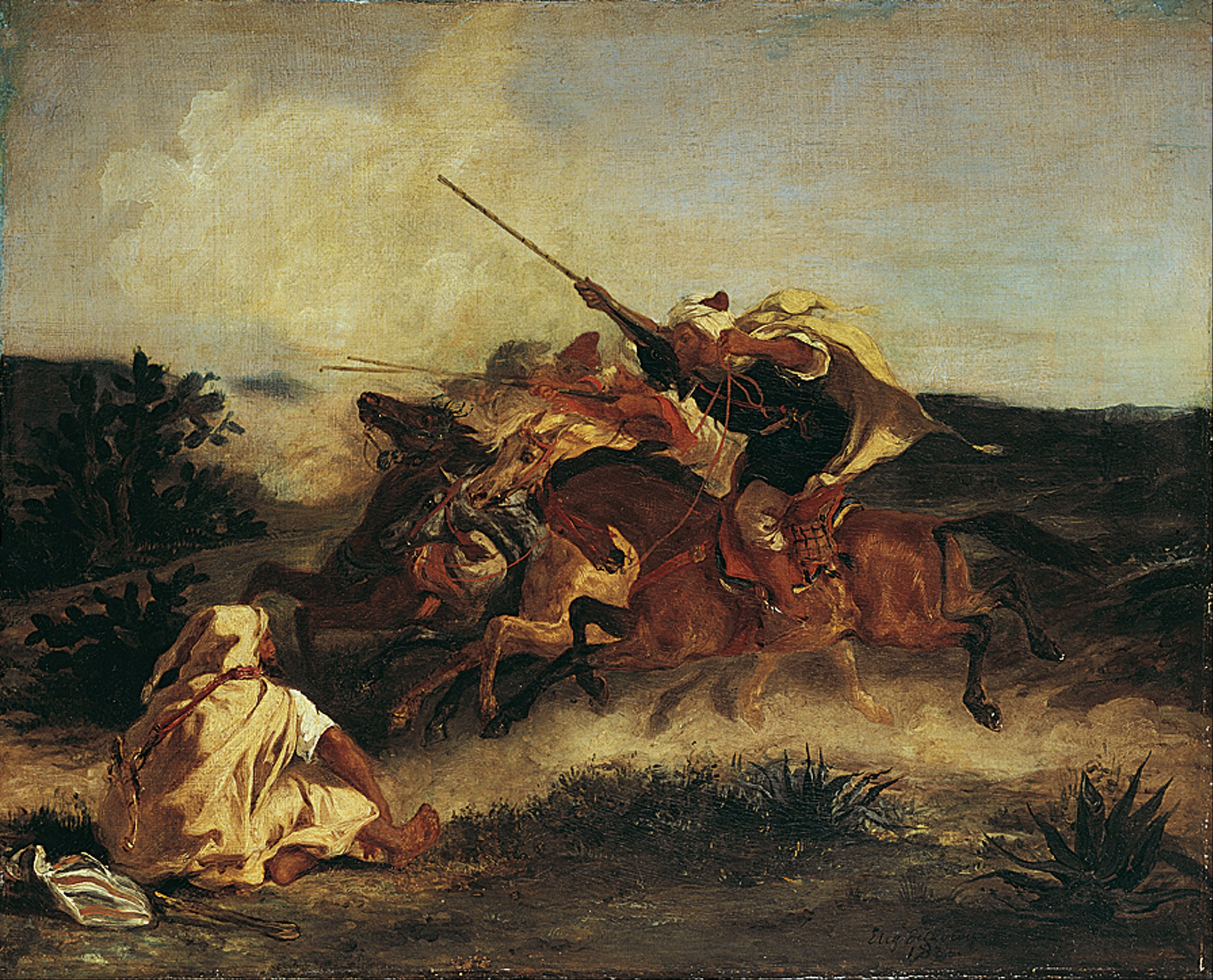
Fantasia Arabe by Eugène Delacroix, 1833

Fantasia (Arabic: الفانتازيا) is a traditional exhibition of horsemanship in the Maghreb performed during cultural festivals and for Maghrebi wedding celebrations. It is present in Algeria, Libya, Mali, Mauritania, Morocco, Niger and Tunisia. It is attested in the ancient Numidian times during which it was practiced by the Numidian cavalry. Historian Carlos Henriques Pereira stated that the North African fantasia also called barud is a modern watered down version of a Numidian military technique.

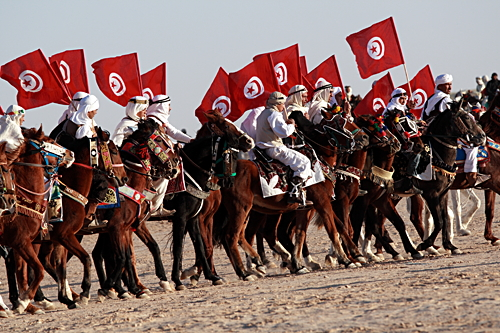
Fantasia at the 43rd International Festival of the Sahara in Douz, Tunisia

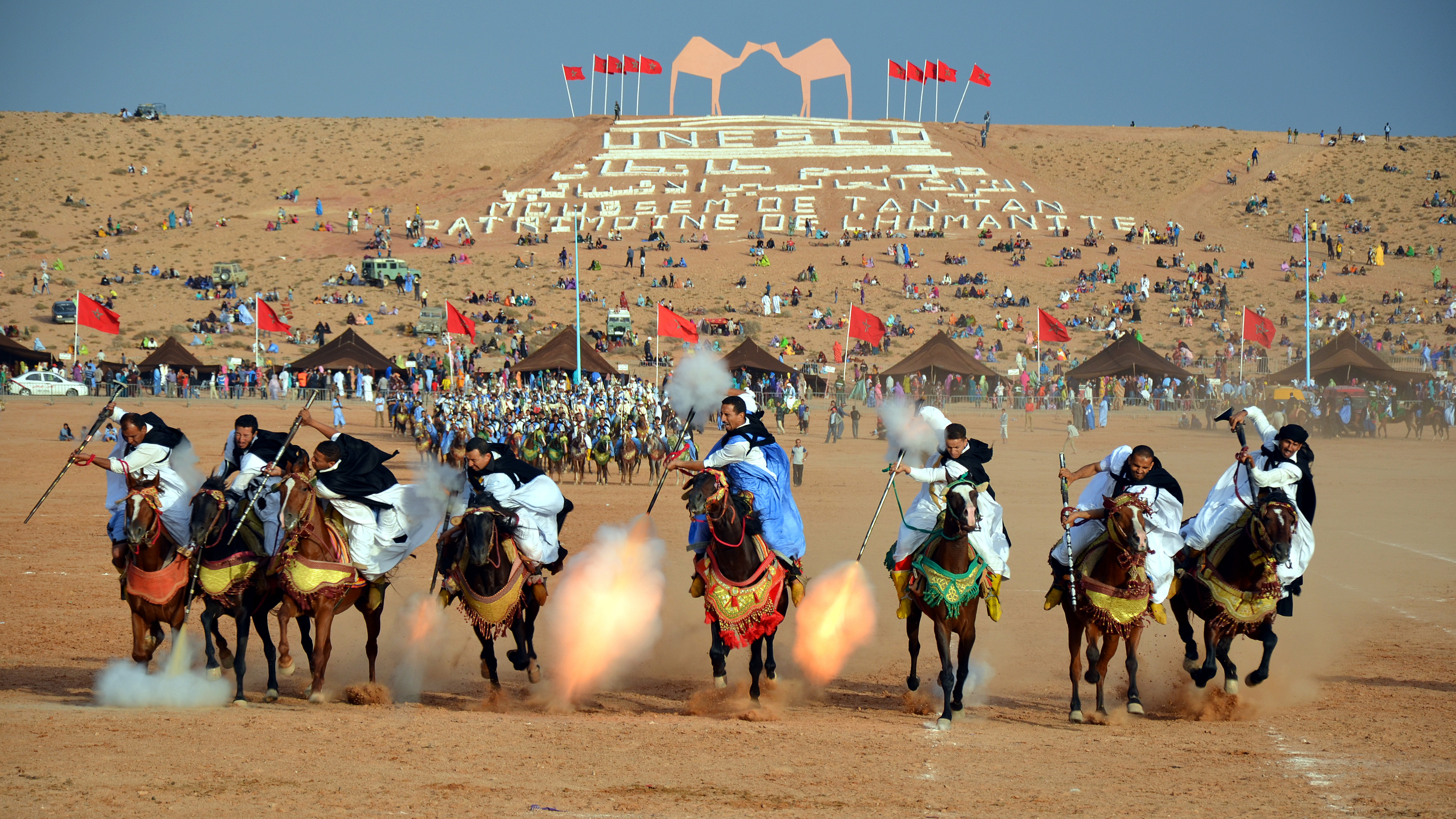
Fantasia in Morocco

Fantasia is considered a cultural performance and a form of martial art; it also symbolizes a strong relationship between the man (or woman) and the horse, as well as an attachment to tradition. According to Jean-Pierre Digard, it is a watered down version of the Numidian cavalry charge.

Fantasia performances usually take place during local seasonal, cultural or religious festivals, also called موسم moussem "saint's day festival" in Maghrebi Arabic.

== History of the performance ==
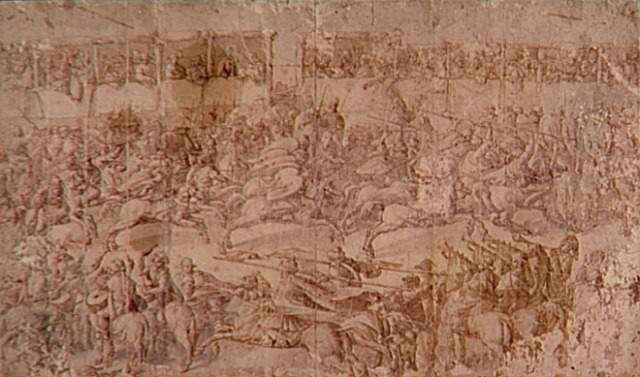
Fantasia in Tunis, Jan Cornelisz Vermeyen, circa 1535

Fantasia has been attested in the ancient times during which it was practised by the Numidians, historian Carlos Henriques Pereira stated that the modern North African fantasia is a watered down version of a Numidian military technique. Fantasia has also been traced back to Arab-Amazigh tribes in the 17th century. Tbourida comes from the cavalry charge performed by an army's vanguard in battle. It was also used in cavalry raiding and celebrations.

== Name ==
The horse is called a fantasia horse; it is of Arabian, Andalusian or Barbary stock. The term “fantasia” is of Latin origin, meaning “entertainment” or Romance meaning “fantasy”. Fantasia is also a name used by French Orientalists.

There are also regional names for the sport, such as tburida (تبوريدة, from the word for gunpowder) or khiyāla (خيالة "horses") in Morocco. The term laʿb al-bārūd (لعب البارود "gunpowder game") and laʿb al-khayl (لعب الخيل "horse game") are also used.

It is known in Tamazight as tafrawt (ⵜⴰⴼⵔⴰⵡⵜ).

== Fantasia in art ==
Some French, Sri Lankan and other Western artists have done oil paintings of the fantasia, including Edmon Vales, Eugène Delacroix, Nasreddine Dinet, Théo van Rysselberghe, Amiru K. Eugène Fromentin and Ulpiano Checa.

== Fantasia in Algeria ==
Fantasia goes back to the period of Numidia (until the end of the Roman Republic). Fantasia is common in Algeria; there are frequent regional

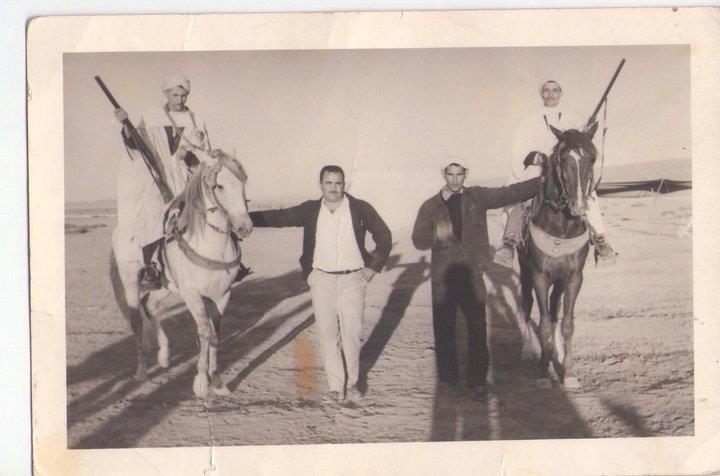
Horsemen from the city of Relizane in the year 1963

festivals and cultural events. Popular festivals include those of Sufi saints like that of Sidi Yahia Bensafia d'Ouled N'hare in Tlemcen and Sidi Ahmed Almadjoub in Naâma, and the Horse Festival in Tiaret. Fantasia is also performed around the annual ziyara (pilgrimage) of Sidi Cheikh. According to the Algerian Equestrian Federation, 350 traditional equestrian associations, spread across the whole of the national territory, perpetuate the Fantasia.

The Fantasia in Algeria is usually performed on a delimited ground of more than one hundred meters long, either in groups of nine to eleven riders or individually. The aim is to showcase skill, speed, rifle firing display, traditional dress, and the horses and their harnesses.

The collective or group Fantasia is classified into two categories of games: the Temerad and the Guelba. In both games, the riders travel from one extremity of the course to the other and then execute the three stages of the Fantasia on their way back. A group leader is responsible for coordinating the performance by signalling, in the form of cries, the start of each stage.

In the Temerad game, the riders approach the other end of the course at a walk, make a U-turn and await the signal from the group leader. At the start cry, the riders start galloping in a single line. At the second cry, the riders stand up, aligned shoulder to shoulder, holding the rifles at the ready. At the third cry, the riders deliver a single blast by firing their arms simultaneously and then continuing the ride without leaving the course until they reach the end in an orderly and calm manner.

In the Guelba game, the riders approach the other end of the course at a trot. The first cry signal is given as soon as they reach it, at which point, they make a swift u-turn and start galloping. Those who fall behind must catch up at an even higher speed for the alignment of the second stage. Although the last two stages are more or less similar to the temerad, the speed at which the first stage is performed makes the Guelba the most accident-prone.

The individual Fantasia, including up to three riders, is performed mainly in eastern Algeria. Galloping from the start, the rider simulates an attack, and after firing, which can be done with one or two rifles successively, the rider then simulates a sabre attack. The game with two riders involves the two riders galloping at the start, holding each other tightly, boot to boot, sometimes going so far as to entwine the arm of one on the shoulders of the other, giving the impression from afar that it is only a single rider. After the volley, the two riders separate and finish the course with a sabre attack display.

Local artists such as the painter Rachid Talbi and the photographer Nadjib Rahmani have produced artwork featuring the Fantasia in Algeria.

== Fantasia in Morocco (Tbourida) ==
Tbourida
- UNESCO Intangible Cultural Heritage
- Country: Morocco
- Reference: 01483
- Region: Arab States

Inscription history
- Inscription: 2021 (16th session)
- List: Representative

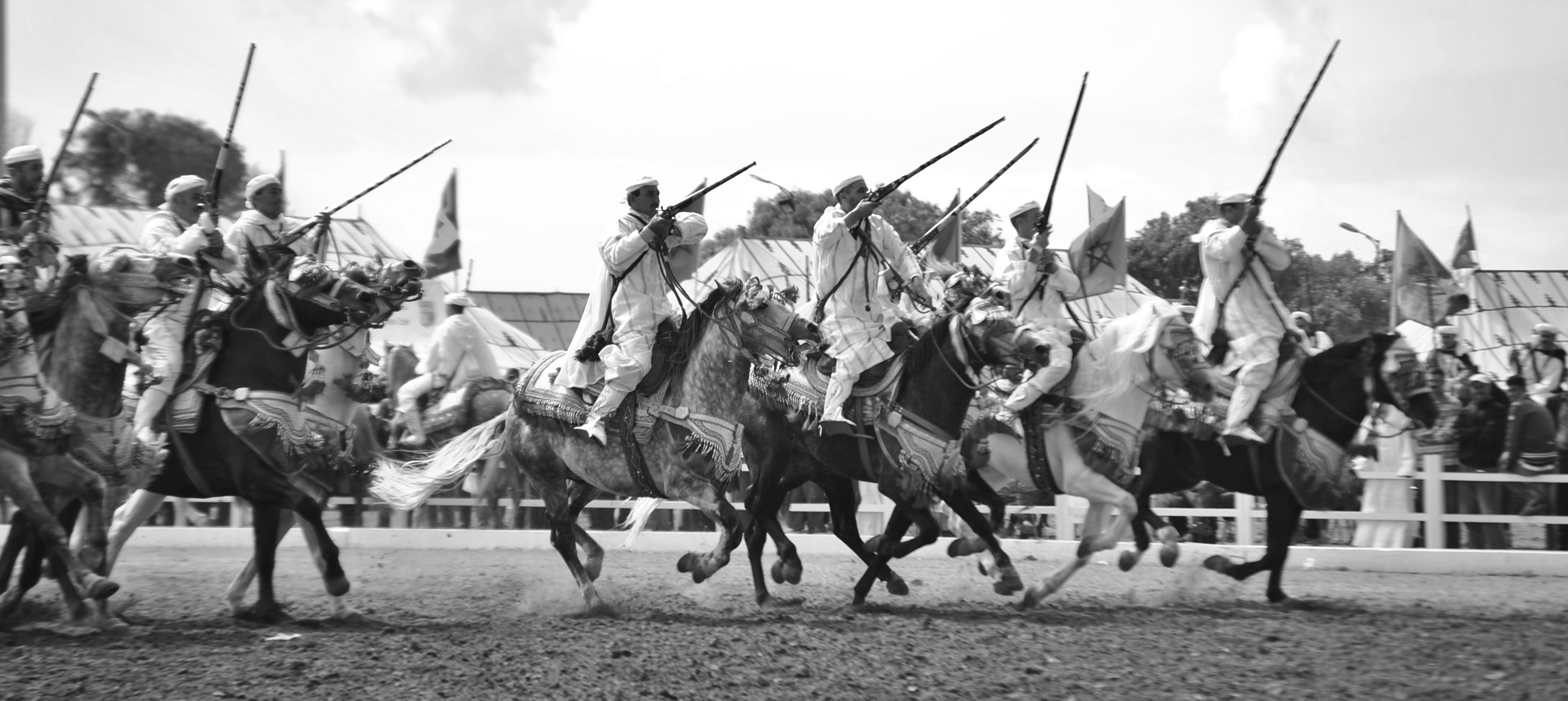
Tbourida in El Jadida

There are frequent Tbourida festivals (moussems) and cultural events in Morocco. Tbourida is also performed during national holidays and agricultural events.

The performance consists of an odd number of horse riders, all wearing traditional clothes, usually carrying a copy of the Quran and a sword, who charge along a straight track called a mahrak, at the same speed to form a line, and then at the end of the charge (about two hundred meters), discharge muskets or muzzle-loading rifles into the air. The difficulty of the performance is in synchronizing the movement of the horses during acceleration of the charge, especially in firing the guns simultaneously so that one single shot is heard. The horses were bred from Arabian and Barb breeds or a mixture. The riders are led by a muqaddam ("boss") in the center of the troupe, usually a more experienced rider, who coordinates the rest of the troupe's movements. A Tbourida show consists of two parts, the hadda and the talqa.

The SOREC (Société Royale d’Encouragement du Cheval, engl. Royal Horse Promotion Society) was created in 2003 as a public enterprise under the Ministry of Agriculture and Fisheries to promote and preserve the practice of Fantasia and Tbourida in Morocco, according to the SOREC, there are about a thousand registered Fantasia troupes. Fantasia troupes are also represented by the Royal Moroccan Equestrian Federation (FRSME). There were 21 registered moussems for 309 troupes in 2014.

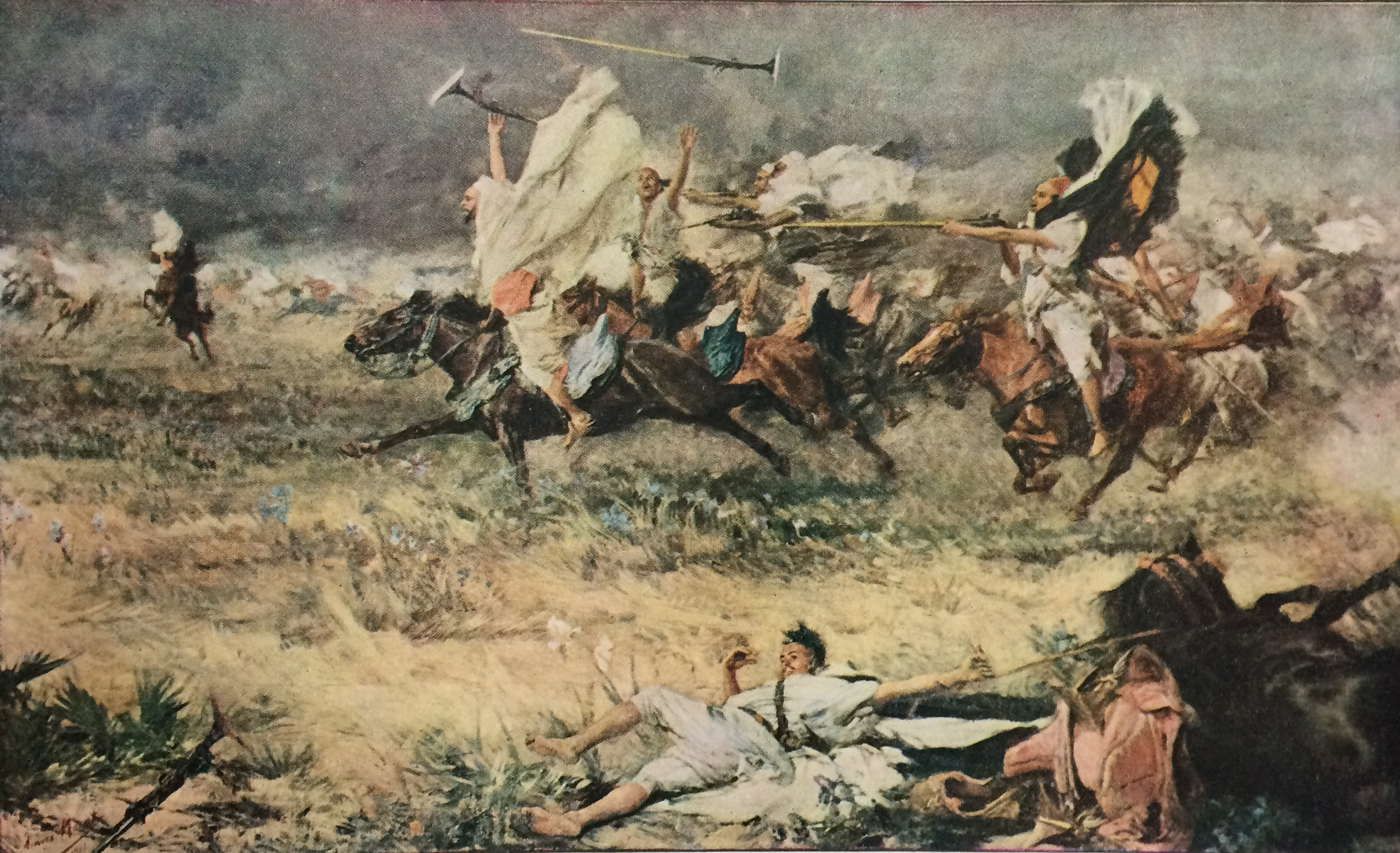
Aimé-Nicolas Morot - Souvenir du Maroc (Fantasia)

Every year, about 330 Moroccan troupes compete for the Hassan II National Tbourida Trophy in El Jadida during the Week of the Horse promoted by the FRSME in Rabat, Morocco. They qualify for the finals through regionally organized competitions through the Federation and SOREC.

Tbourida was inscribed in the UNESCO Intangible Cultural Heritage Lists in 2021 during the 16th session of the Intergovernmental Committee for the Safeguarding of the Intangible Cultural Heritage in 2019 by the Ministry of Culture, the SOREC and 4 local Tbourida associations.

Moroccan artists such as Hassan El Glaoui have prolifically produced artwork featuring Moroccan riders and horses.

== See also ==
- Mawsim
- Tbourida
