= 1-54 =

Contemporary African art fair

1:54 is an annual contemporary African art fair held in London, England, during the October Frieze Week since 2013. It was organized to improve the representation of contemporary African art in worldwide exhibitions, and is the foremost art fair dedicated to contemporary African art in the primary art market. By 2016, the show had become three times the size of the original exhibition, with 130 artists represented. A spin-off, pop-up show, 1:54 NY, has been held annually in New York City during the May Frieze New York since 2015. A third location, in Marrakesh, began in 2018. Critics have described 1:54 as a highlight of the Frieze event, and wrote that the show's publicity for contemporary African art outweighs the issues of lumping disparate geographic traditions together. The fair's representation from African galleries has improved as the international market for African art expands.

== History ==
1:54 is a contemporary African art fair held annually in London, beginning in 2013. As of 2015, 1:54 is the only art fair dedicated to contemporary African art in the primary art market. Its name refers to the 54 countries that compose the African continent, expressed as a ratio ("one continent: 54 countries"). Moroccan curator Touria El Glaoui, daughter of the artist Hassan El Glaoui, organized the fair to improve the representation of contemporary African art in worldwide art exhibitions. Representation of non-Western countries in the contemporary art world has lagged behind that of other countries. Representation of African countries, in particular, improved alongside the continent's economic growth. El Glaoui said that the continent did not have a single art scene, and that there was great diversity between African nations. Accordingly, as in the fair's title, 1:54 tries to preserve rather than homogenize the differences between each country's histories and cultures. In starting the fair, its founder was supported and advised by the British Council, the Francophonie, and partners ArtReview, Beaux Art magazine, and Art.sy. For each edition, the 1:54 organizers ask themselves "what is necessary, what can be achieved, how [to] do something different". The fair's organizers choose exhibitors based on proposal submissions and the firms' reputation and plans. Travel visa issues have also affected whether invitees ultimately attend.

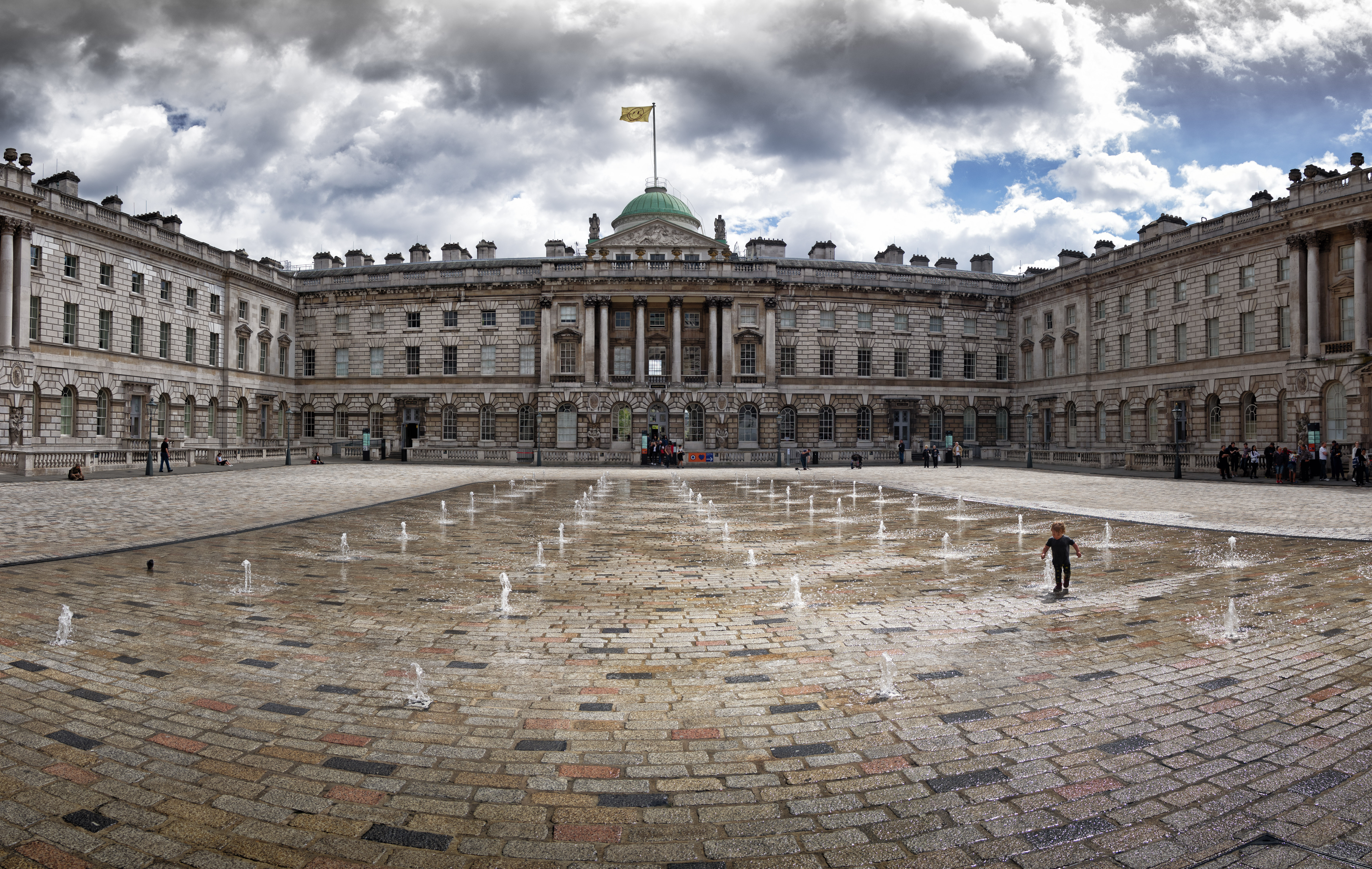
Somerset House, where the London 1:54 fair is held

The fair debuted in October 2013 during Frieze Week, where about 6,000 people visited the fair held in Somerset House, London. David Adjaye's company designed the fair's architectural features. By the next year, held at the same time and venue, the event had doubled in size, with 10,000 visitors and a greater variety of curators from outside African-specific specialties. More than 100 African artists exhibited in 27 galleries, including photographers J. D. 'Okhai Ojeikere, Malick Sidibé, Paul Sika, pop artist Hassan Hajjaj, sound artist Emeka Ogboh, and performance artist Athi-Patra Ruga. Mid-20th century photography was in particular prominence. The fair featured a series of lectures and panels, including a set curated by Koyo Kouoh of the Senegalese Raw Material Company, film screenings, and curator discussions on the future of African art. The 2014 event's primary sponsor was the Sindika Dokolo Foundation.

After two years in London, 1:54 held a pop-up show, 1:54 NY, at the Red Hook art venue Pioneer Works during the May 2015 Frieze New York. Kouoh returned to lead a forum on present and future ideas of African diasporic identities and practices, and RA Projects, who had previously worked with 1:54, returned to design the New York exhibit. The show used a standard gallery layout as the open, industrial space was divided into white-walled booths. Sixteen international galleries participated—most were from American and European countries, apart from five South African galleries and one each from Côte d'Ivoire, Morocco, and Nigeria. Exhibited artists were from African nations and the African diaspora, living in other Western countries. They included William Kentridge, Malick Sidibé, Seydou Keïta, Peter Clarke, Lavar Munroe, Billie Zangewa, and Omar Victor Diop. Particularly due to the New York event's smaller size, 1:54's founder said that they tried to show the most exciting artists and exhibitors rather than show a survey of the 54 countries. The expansion into New York was a "natural progression" for the fair, based on their existing institutional relationships. It also expanded the fair's scope into American and African-American art professionals, and the American art market—the show's foremost focus was bringing new artists to New York patronage. The event was planned in six months. 1:54 held a second New York show in 2016 with 17 galleries, including five based in Africa, and a partnership with the Dakar Biennale. Dartmouth's Hood Museum of Art purchased Eric Van Hove's Testosterone installation. Compared to the London event, 1:54 NY is smaller and designed to be more intimate, with an active community and different audience, although the two shows are not significantly different.

In its third year in London, the 2015 show had 15,000 visitors. The fourth London show in October 2016 was three times the size of the original exhibition, and had expanded from a wing of Somerset House to the rest of the building and its courtyard, where Zak Ové installed a site-specific work that was purchased for a sculpture park in Berkshire.

The 2016 fair featured 130 artists, including the fair's first artists representing Egypt, Ethiopia, and Ghana. Koyo Kouoh's forum series returned to the event as well. Of the 40 exhibitors from 18 countries, 40 per cent were from Africa and 17 galleries debuted at the show. The fair's founder viewed these expansions as a sign of progress for the African art market.

1:54 expanded into Marrakesh in February 2018, its third location. Held at luxury hotel La Mamounia, the fair coincided with the 7th Marrakech Biennale. While 1-54 skipped its 2020 New York exhibition due to the COVID-19 pandemic, the London show exhibited in both 2020 and 2021. The New York show returned in May 2021. When 1-54's 2021 Marrakesh fair was postponed due to the COVID-19 pandemic, a pop-up show in Paris, France, was organized in its place, in 18 of Christie's galleries. Paris and online access were more accessible to galleries and collectors than the more remote Marrakesh.

== Reception ==
Okay Africa wrote that by its second year, the fair had become Europe's foremost contemporary African art fair, and Naomi Rea of Artnet News called it a necessary visit during the London Frieze Art Fair. In New York, Ben Davis of Artnet wrote that 1:54 NY was a highlight of the city's art fair week. Critics had typically questioned whether art fairs with narrow geographic scope, such as 1:54, highlight or ostracize minority artists. A gallery owner from Seattle saw the fair as a route for further integration into larger markets. Artnet's Davis expressed distaste at the art fair trend of lumping artists by their geographic region and generalizing trends based on its parts, but nonetheless considered important 1:54's representation of Africa.

Critics initially noted the fair's lack of African gallery representation, but cited justification including the African art scene's nascent state and the continent's history of political instability, which affects both overseas trade and gallery security. At the 2015 New York show, reviewers noted elements including the predominantly white gallery exhibition staff and the marquee display of a popular artist at a fair for marginal artists.
