= Tweeza =

Folklore in North Africa

Tiwizi (ⵜⵉⵡⵉⵣⵉ; Arabic: تويزة), in darija "Twiza", also spelled as Touiza, or Tweeza refers to an ancestral, traditional system of collective voluntary work used in North Africa in which a group of people from a community or village team up in order to contribute to the achievement of one or more members' cause. There are multiple kinds of tweeza.

== Etymology ==
It derives from the same root as the verbal form “wiz”, which means to help someone complete a task to which he is committed; He is called iwizu or iuizi (pl. iwaziwen) and it means that the person is now a member of Tiwizi.

== Types of Tweeza ==
While tweeza is the general umbrella, it branches into numerous different concepts. Specific activities include:

- Collective agricultural fieldwork (Tagrza) like ploughing, planting, harvesting grain, olives, and nuts, etc..
- Construction work (Tizeghi n tghremt): People from a village may also gather to build a house and other types of Construction for the needy families and communities
- Amazighs also regularly practice tweeza during important public occasions such as the Yennayer celebrations, and personal events like weddings (e.g: preparing the bride's trousseau), etc.
- Other seasonal and purposeful work is also very important, for example, gathering to finish big tasks collectively, such as Oula, weaving (Azeṭṭa) rugs, Burnous garments, textiles and wool spinning

== Tweeza as an opportunity for social engagement ==

Sociologically, Twiza is a powerful tool for building and deepening social ties, rather than just a functional labor arrangement. Twiza leverages communal work as a chance to deepen interpersonal networks, and transfer knowledge. It brings together different people and different age groups and families, cultivating a shared sense of belonging and unity. Traditional Twizas are always accompanied by songs (izlan), traditional poetry, Cultural rituals that vary by region and communal feasts, this shifts labor from a tiresome chore to a joyful social event and a place for artistic expression.

== Symbolism ==
This collective and voluntary activity thus represents a sense of communal awareness and solidarity from the members of the community. Participants do not expect financial compensation. Instead, it relies on a system of reciprocal assistance, where everyone implicitly understands that the community will help them when their time comes.

== Cultural status ==
While it remains a fundamental cultural value among elders, Touizas became less widespread among the younger generations, with modern efforts to revitalize and reimagine the tradition. Actions that maintain the concept of Tweeza and rehabilitate it in the form of a voluntary service which was once practiced everywhere in the rural and village world, must be protected and preserved from the tendency to disappear over time due to modernity and urbanization.

== See also ==
- Berbers
- Yennayer
- Tunisia
- Algeria
- Morocco
- Ksar
