= Emine =

Turkish given name

- Gender: Female

Origin
- Origin: Arabic
- Meaning: Faithful, truthful, trustworthy, courageous
- Region of origin: Middle East

Other names
- Nickname: Emi
- Related names: Emin, Amina, Emmie

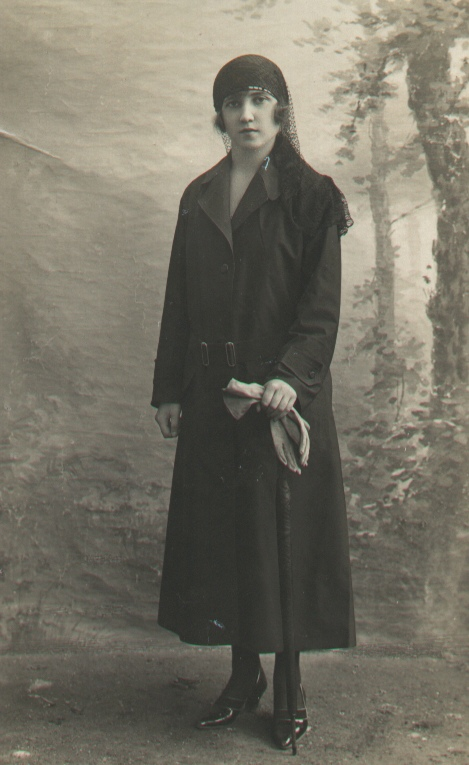
A notable Emine was Emine Beraet, the daughter of conductor Zeki Bay. She was born in İstanbul on April 27, 1907.

Emine is an Arabic-origin given name used for women in Turkey. It has three major meanings: (1) one in whom you can trust and believe, (2) one who is benign and innocuous, and (3) one who is fearless and courageous. It is also argued that the word means beautiful. The name is also used in Japanese (えみね), often with the kanji 笑音 meaning "smiling sound".

== Origins and variants ==
The origin of Emine is Arabic, but its source word has not been clearly established, and two accounts are given. It may be either the feminine form of Emin or a derivative of the African, Arabic, English, and Swahili name Amina. Emmie is considered to be the Western version of the name.

The name of a sixth-century Leinster-based Irish cleric was Émíne. Emine was also the given name of the Roman emperor's daughter who was the lover of the Sultan of Babylon in Thomas Lodge's historical romance The History of Robert, Second Duke of Normandy. The name was one of the 16th century Ottoman feminine names recorded in Istanbul.

== Given name ==
Notable people with that name include:

=== Female ===
- Emine Naciye Sultan, full name of Naciye Sultan (1896–1957), Ottoman princess
- Emine Arıcı (born 1997), Turkish volleyball player
- Emine Arslan (born 1989), Turkish kickboxer
- Emine Ayna (born 1968), Turkish politician
- Emine Bilgin (born 1984), Turkish weightlifter
- Emine Bozkurt (born 1967), Dutch politician of Turkish descent
- Emine Çaykara (born 1964), Turkish historian and writer
- Emine Çolak (born 1958), Turkish Cypriot lawyer
- Emine Demir (born 1993), Turkish footballer
- Emine Dursun (born 2001), Turkish darts player
- Emine Dzhaparova (born 1983), Crimean Tatar journalist and politician
- Emine Ecem Esen (born 1994), Turkish footballer
- Emine Erdoğan (born 1955), wife of Turkish President Recep Tayyip Erdoğan
- Emine Fetvaci, Turkish art historian and academic
- Emine Gevheri Kadın (1856–1884), Ottoman consort of Sultan Abdulaziz
- Emine Göğebakan (born 2001), Turkish taekwondo practitioner
- Emine Gökdemir (born 2003), Turkish handball player
- Emine Mebrure Gönenç (1900–1981), Turkish teacher and politician
- Emine Gümüş (born 1992), Turkish footballer
- Emine Guri (born 1937), Albanian politician
- Emine Hatun (died 1449), wife of Ottoman Sultan Mehmed I
- Emina Ilhamy (1858–1931), Egyptian royal
- Emine Işınsu (1938–2021), Turkish writer
- Emine Kara (1974–2022), Kurdish militant and political activist
- Emine Mihrişah Sultan (died 1732), French-born second concubine of Ottoman Sultan Ahmed III, and the mother of Mustafa III
- Emine Mukbile Sultan (1911–1995), Ottoman princess
- Emine Muslihe Kadın (1699–1750), Ottoman consort of Sultan Ahmed III
- Emine Gulbahar Hatun (died 1492), Ottoman lady and mother of Sultan Bayezid II
- Emine Nazikeda (1866–1941), principal consort of Sultan Mehmet VI, the last Ottoman sultan
- Emine Nemika Sultan (1888–1969), Ottoman princess
- Emine Nur Günay (born 1962), Turkish economist, politician and parliamentarian
- Emine Sabancı Kamışlı (born 1966), Turkish billionaire businesswoman
- Emine Sare Aydın (born 1975), Turkish politician and academic
- Emine Seçkin (born 1980), Turkish para-badminton player
- Emine Semiye Önasya (1864-1944), Turkish writer
- Emine Sevgi Özdamar (born 1946), Turkish-German actress, director and author
- Emine Sultan (daughter of Abdulaziz) (1874–1920), Ottoman princess
- Emine Sultan (daughter of Mustafa II) (1696–1739), Ottoman princess
- Emine Ülker Tarhan (born 1963), Turkish jurist and politician

=== Male ===
- Emînê Evdal (1906–1964), Kurdish writer, linguist and poet

=== Middle name ===
- Suzan Emine Kaube (born 1942), Turkish-German writer, painter and pedagogue

== Other usages ==
The word Emine has also been used for geographical areas and places. A headland at the Bulgarian Black Sea coast is called Cape Emine. In addition, there is Emine Mountain or Emine Dagh in Stara planina in Bulgaria. The other related geographical term is Emine Balkan, which was used by the Bulgarians instead of Rumeli (Roman country) to refer to the territory of Bulgaria where some Turkish tribes had lived since the 11th century. Here, the word is derived not from Arabic, but from Greek (Haemus: Αἵμον [acc.]), where it is, in turn, a derivative of *Ἔμμωνα, Emona, discovered in documents of the early 14th century. However, Maria Todorova claims that Emine Balkan is the literal Ottoman translation of "Haemus mountain" and that the term was also employed by the Ottomans who derived the word Emine from the Byzantine words "Aimos", "Emmon", and "Emmona". In Ijevan, Armenia, a quarters is called Emine kışlağı.

In the 16th century Ottoman Empire, emine was the term used for export tax.

== See also ==
- Killing of Emine Bulut, 2019 femicide in Turkey
- Emini, people with this South Slavic surname
