= Özgür Dengiz =

Turkish serial killer and cannibal

- Born: 1984 (age 41–42); Edirne, Turkey
- Other name: Cannibal of Ankara
- Penalty: Life imprisonment (x2) (overturned); Psychiatric imprisonment

Details
- Victims: 3
- Span of crimes: 2001–2007
- Country: Turkey
- Date apprehended: September 14, 2007

Özgür Dengiz (born 1984) is a Turkish serial killer and cannibal. Captured on September 14, 2007, in Ankara, he admitted killing two men, attempting to murder another man and cannibalising one of his victims. He is nicknamed the "Cannibal of Ankara".

== Early years ==
Özgür Dengiz was born in Edirne to Satılmış, a non-commissioned officer and veteran of the Turkish invasion of Cyprus, and Sultan, a seamstress. He fought with his parents constantly, and often ran away from home. He did not continue his education after finishing middle school.

When he was 17, he killed one of his friends during an argument, and was sentenced to a reduced 10-year sentence in prison due to his young age. His father was the one who turned him in to police. He served three years of the sentence before being pardoned by President Ahmet Necdet Sezer.

He then joined the army at his father's insistence. During his military service, he was hospitalized several times for psychological problems. Dengiz attempted to escape the military multiple times, and due to failed attempts his aggression increased.

After completing his service, he returned to Ankara. His mother opened a tailor shop for him; however, he did not stop by even briefly.

== Crimes ==
On June 5, 2007, Dengiz killed Sedat Erzurumlu, a computer engineer, who angered him by saying that he could not afford to buy the laptop he had been looking at. Dengiz stole two laptops from the store, and took also his victim's mobile phone with him. Later on, Dengiz tried to sell one of the laptops, but was cheated out of the money. He kept the other one at home.

On September 12, 2007, Dengiz shot a garbage collector at the Mamak Dump. A few hours later, he met Cafer Er, a 55-year-old municipal worker, and killed him after a brief conversation by shooting him in the head twice from behind. He dragged his victim's body and put it in his car. Then, he skinned the corpse with a cleaver; he ate some of it raw and put the rest in his bag. He wrapped the body in a cloth and put it in the trunk. He abandoned the corpse at the Mamak Dump and returned to the apartment he shared with his parents. He gave a piece of flesh to stray dogs outside his apartment. He then put the remaining flesh in the refrigerator.

== Capture ==
Cafer Er had been missing for days when his corpse was discovered in the Mamak Dump. On closer examination, it became apparent that he had been murdered, his body mutilated and large chunks of flesh cut from the soft parts of his body. Further investigation revealed that Er had last been seen arguing with a young man in the park he was responsible for keeping clean.

The police soon traced Dengiz with the help of recording of calls Dengiz made with the mobile phone he had stolen from his second victim Erzurumlu, but lost at the last murder scene. They conducted a search of his apartment for evidence, and discovered fresh meat in a plastic bag in the refrigerator. They took samples for analysis, which proved the positive identification of a human arm, buttock and thigh.

=== Questioning, arrest, and conviction ===
Dengiz showed no remorse for his crimes, saying he was irresistibly drawn to eating human flesh. The only emotion he is said to have exhibited as he explained his behavior was to break into fits of laughter. He said he would have kept killing had he not been caught.

After making his statement, Dengiz was arrested by the court. He was later found guilty of 2 murders, and sentenced to 2 life sentences. However, the Court of Cassation of Turkey ruled that Dengiz was insane, and not fit to stand accused. His conviction and sentence was overthrown, and Dengiz was admitted to the psychiatric wing of a mental hospital.

== See also ==
- List of incidents of cannibalism
- List of serial killers by country
