= Emini =

Emini (Macedonian: Емини; Russian: Эмини) is a surname occurring mainly in Albania, Kosovo and Macedonia. Notable people with the surname include:

- Donika Emini, Kosovan dancer, model and beauty pageant winner
- Hasan Emini (died 2017), Albanian footballer
- Izair Emini (born 1985), Macedonian footballer
- Lorik Emini (born 1999), Swiss-born Kosovan footballer
- Sefer Emini (born 2000), Macedonian footballer
- Vulnet Emini (born 1978), Macedonian footballer

== See also ==
- Emine, women with this Turkish feminine given name
