= Cuerda seca =

Technique for applying colored glazes to ceramics

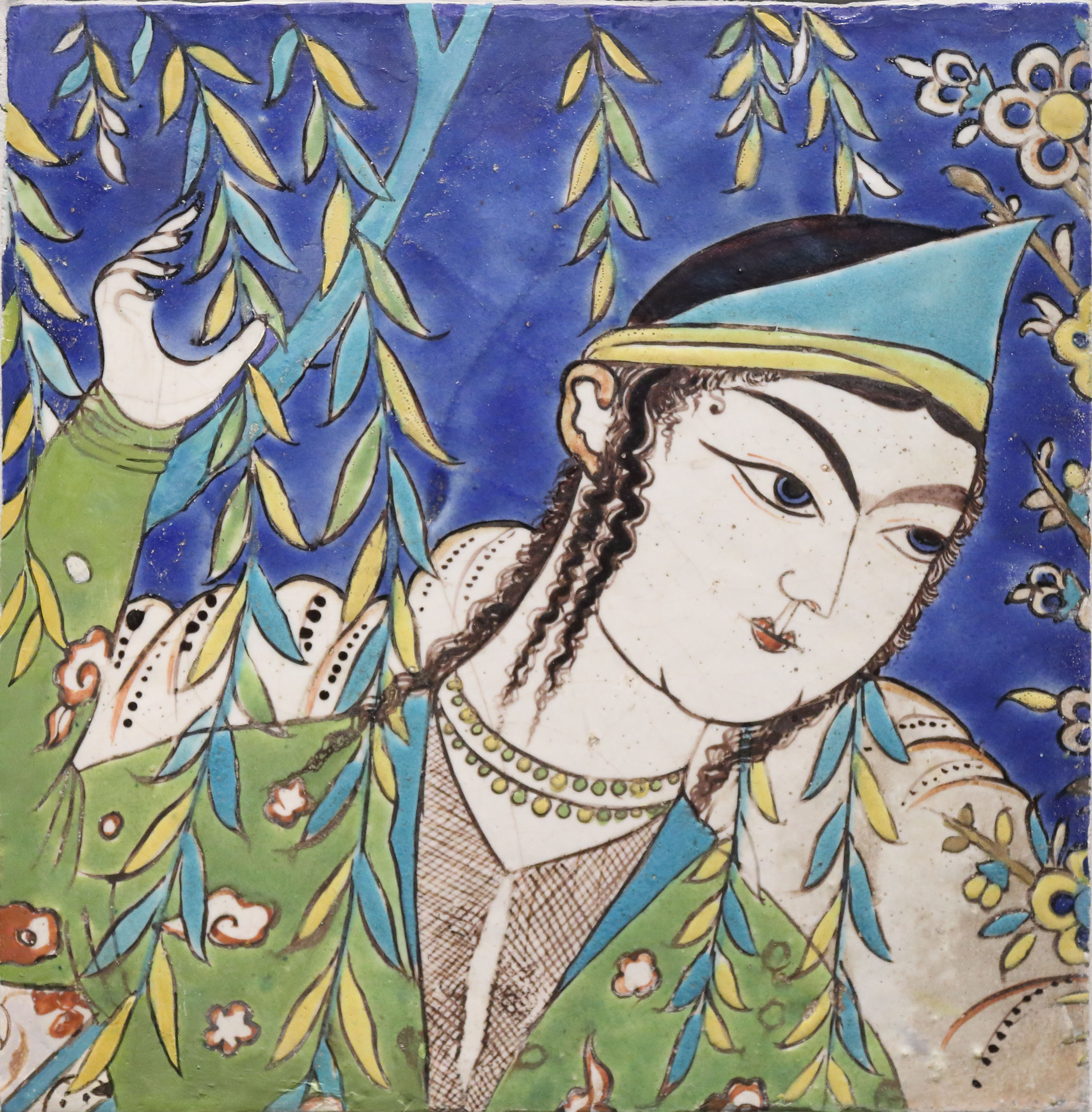
Tile from Isfahan in Iran, 17th century

Cuerda seca (Spanish for "dry cord") is a technique used when applying coloured glazes to ceramic surfaces.

== Description ==
When different coloured glazes are applied to a ceramic surface, the glazes have a tendency to run together during the firing process. In the cuerda seca technique, the water-soluble glazes are separated on the surface by thin lines of a greasy substance to prevent them running out of their delineated areas. A dark pigment such as manganese carbonate is usually mixed with the grease to produce a dark line around each coloured area.

== History ==
The origin of the technique is not known for certain. Many scholars believe that the cuerda seca technique originated primarily in al-Andalus (Islamic Spain and Portugal) in the second half of the 10th century, during the Umayyad period (citing Umayyad-era examples from Suza). Although not universally accepted, scholar Juan Zozaya argues that the advent of this style in al-Andalus could have been spurred by Chinese ceramics which were imported to the region from an early period. The technique was further advanced during the Taifas period in the 11th century. Preserved fragments of tiles from the late 12th-century minaret of the Kasbah Mosque in Marrakesh, Morocco, have been cited as the earliest surviving example of cuerda seca tilework being used for architectural decoration.

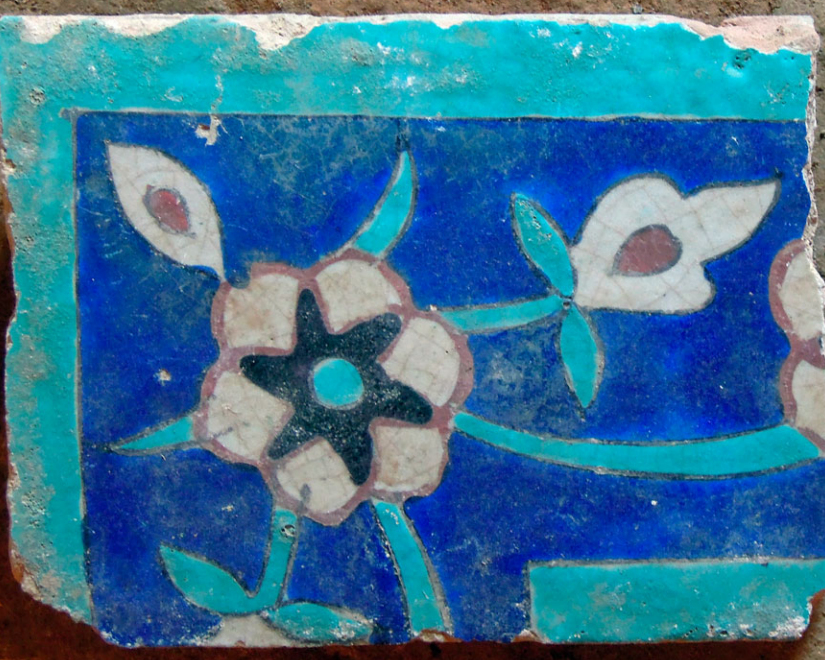
Haft-rang with black lines. Gawhar Shad Madrasa, 1418-1434.

In Central Asia, Haft-rang ("seven colors") enamelled tiles were manufactured using the cuerda seca technique from the second half of the 14th century. Hans Van Lemmen postulates that these tiles, from the Timurid period (late 14th to 15th centuries), were the "earliest development of cuerda seca". The introduction of different coloured glazes is recorded in the mausoleums of the Shah-i-Zinda necropolis in Samarkand. In the 1360s the colours were restricted to white, turquoise and cobalt blue but by 1386 the palette had been expanded to include yellow, light-green and unglazed red. Large quantities of cuerda seca tiles were produced during the Timurid (1370–1507) and Safavid (1501–1736) periods.

In the 15th century Persian potters from Tabriz introduced the technique into Turkey and were responsible for decorating the Yeşil Mosque in Bursa (1419-1424). Within the Ottoman Empire cuerda seca tilework fell out of fashion in the 1550s and new imperial buildings were decorated with underglaze-painted tiles from İznik. The last building in Istanbul to include cuerda seca tilework was the Kara Ahmed Pasha Mosque which was designed in 1555 but only completed in 1572.

== Gallery ==
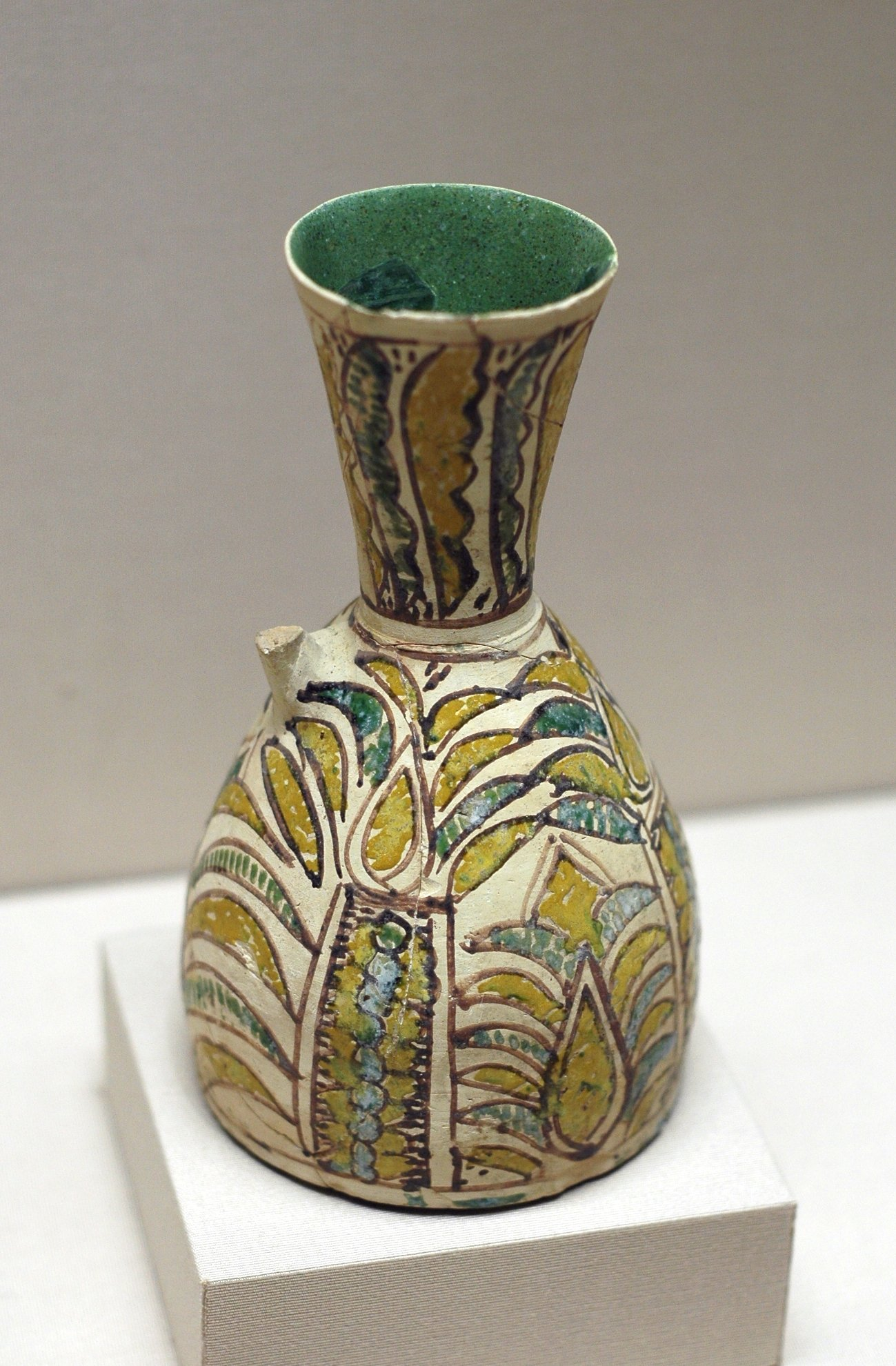
Pitcher in cuerda seca style from Susa in Iran, 8th-9th century

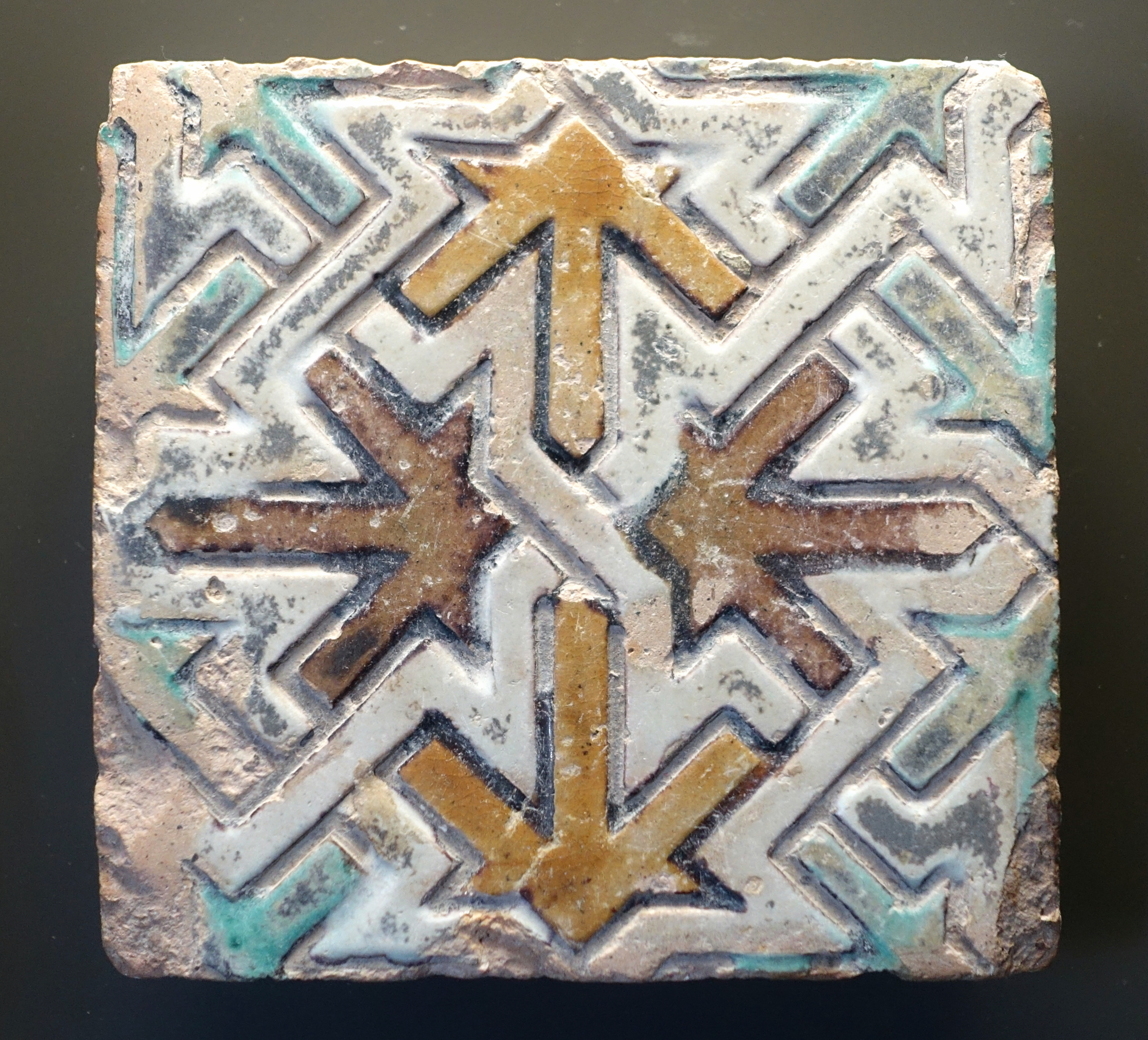
Cuerda seca tile from the Alcazar of Seville, 12th-13th century

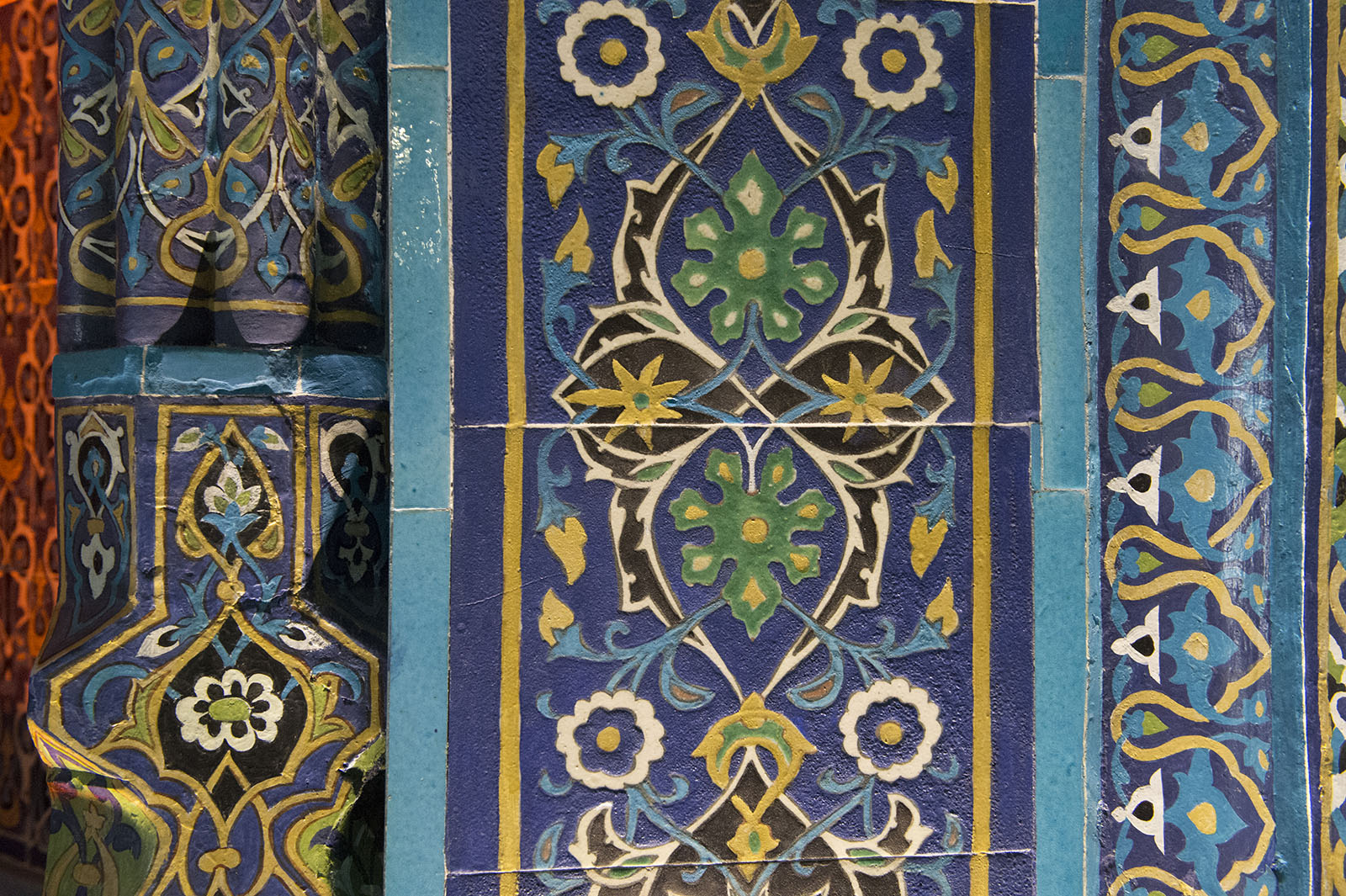
Tiles in the Green Mosque, Bursa, c. 1420

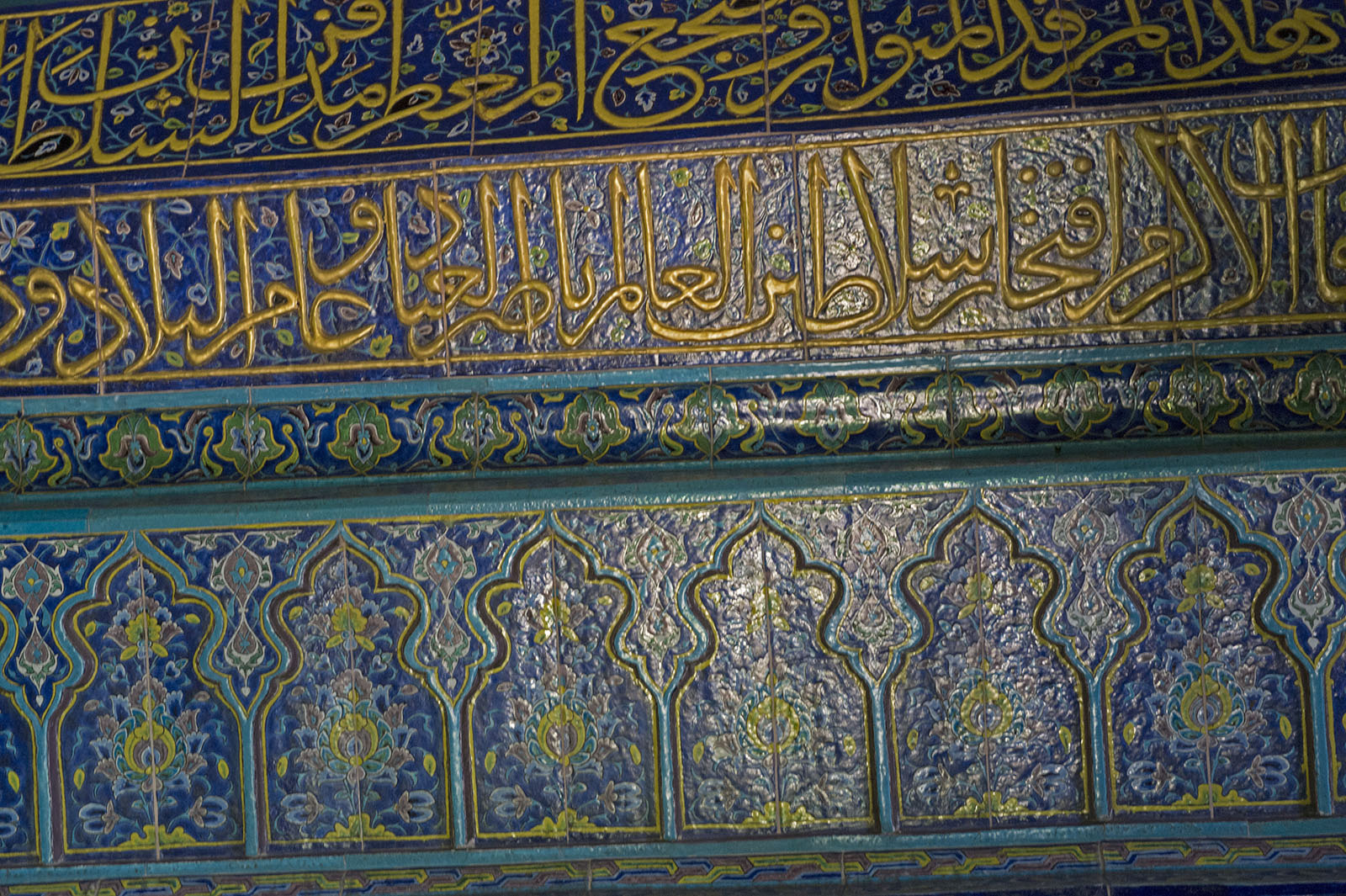
Details of the Green Tomb in Bursa

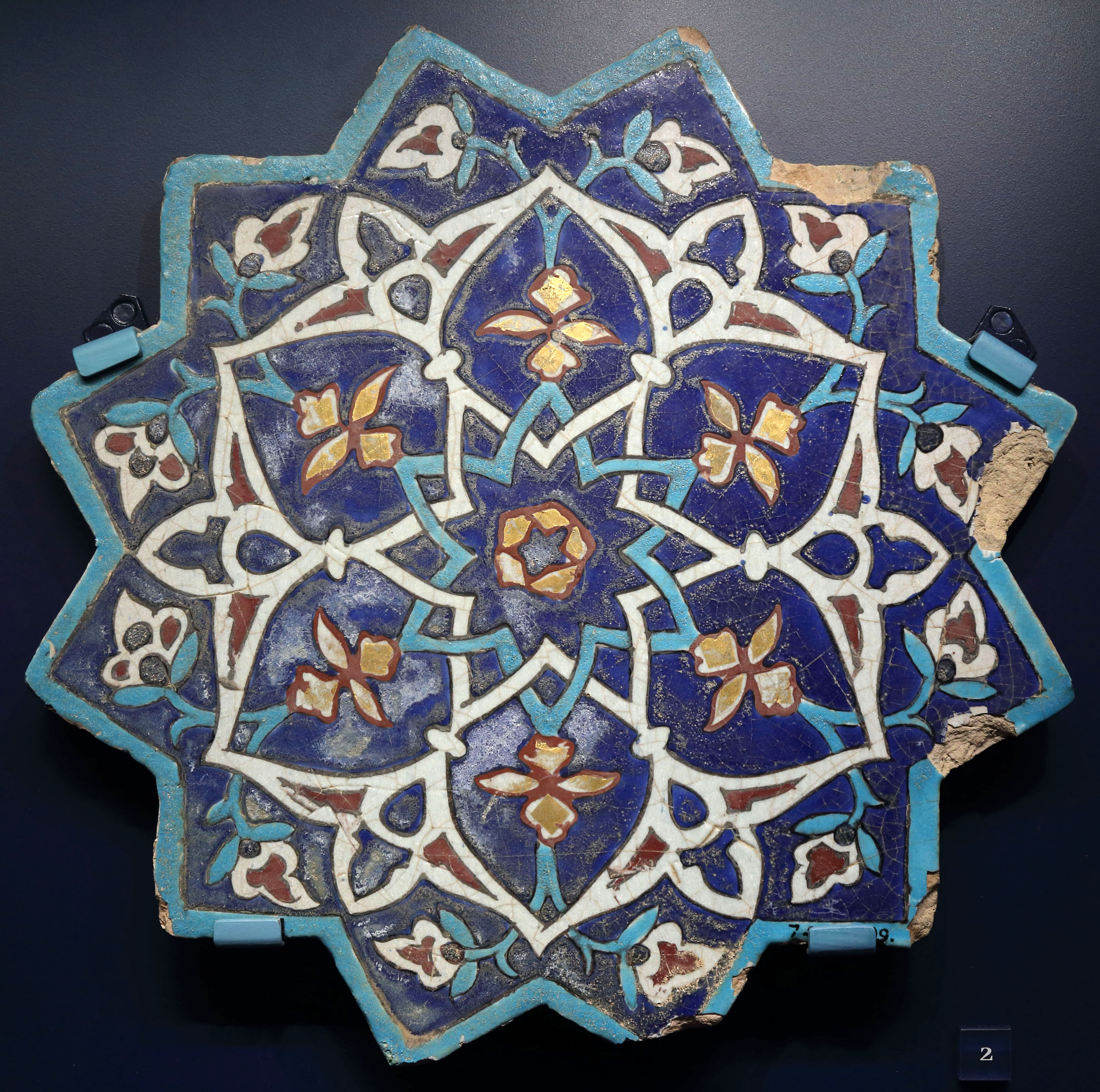
Tile from Khargird in Iran, mid 15th century

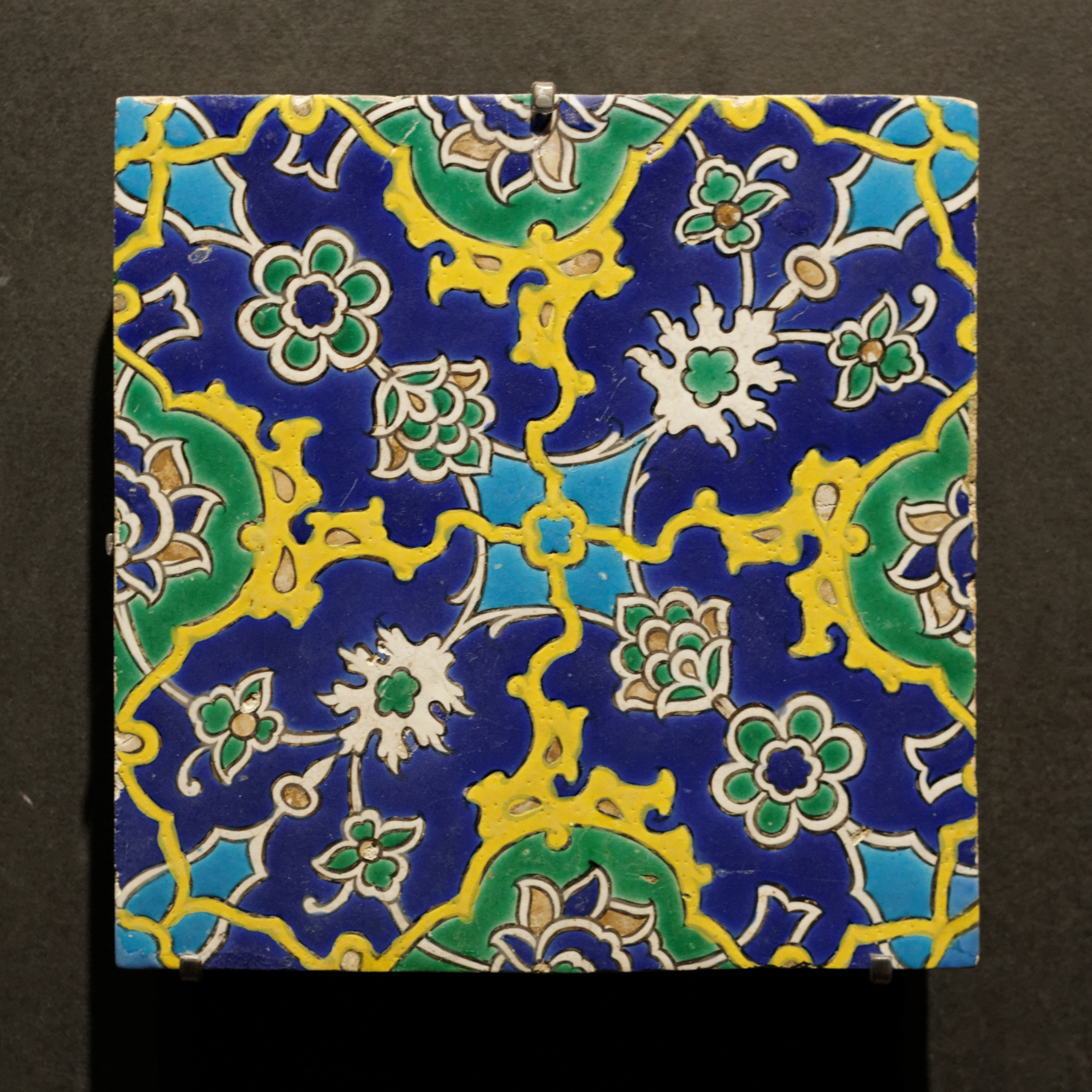
Ottoman tile, Istanbul, first half 16th century

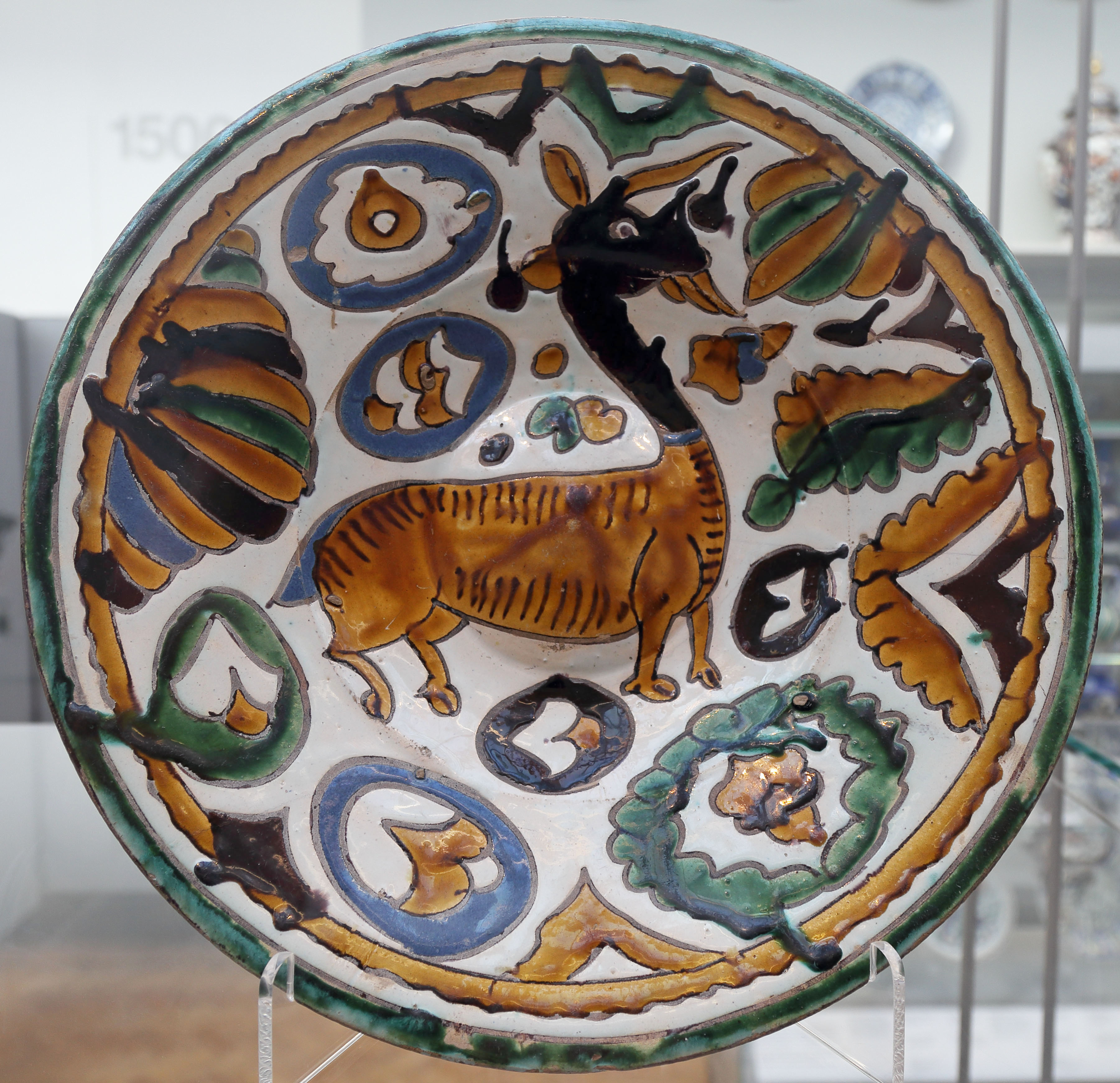
Dish from Seville in Spain, early 16th century

== Sources ==
- Atasoy, Nurhan; Raby, Julian (1989). Iznik: The Pottery of Ottoman Turkey. London: Alexandra Press. ISBN 978-1-85669-054-6.
- Campbell, Gordon, ed. (2006). "Cuerda seca and cuenca tiles". The Grove Encyclopedia of Decorative Arts, Volume 1. New York: Oxford University Press. p. 293. ISBN 978-0-19-518948-3.
- Necipoğlu, Gülru (2005). The Age of Sinan: Architectural Culture in the Ottoman Empire. London: Reaktion Books. ISBN 978-1-86189-253-9.
- Porter, Venetia (1995). Islamic Tiles. London: British Museum Press. ISBN 978-0-7141-1456-9.
