= Kalyoncu cabinet =

Kalyoncu cabinet was the government of Northern Cyprus between 16 July 2015 and 16 April 2016, consisting of 10 ministers formed by a coalition of the Republican Turkish Party (CTP) and National Unity Party (UBP), under prime minister Ömer Kalyoncu from the CTP. The two parties shared the ministries equally, and formed a government for the first time. All ministers from the UBP were MPs, while the CTP initially had three from outside the parliament.

== Composition ==
Title	Name	Start of Term	End of Term	Party
Prime Minister	Ömer Kalyoncu	16 July 2015	16 April 2016	Republican Turkish Party
Minister for Interior and Labour	Aziz Gürpınar	16 July 2015	20 October 2015	Republican Turkish Party
Minister for Interior and Labour	Asım Akansoy	20 October 2015	16 April 2016	Republican Turkish Party
Minister of Finance	Hasan Başoğlu	16 July 2015	20 October 2015	Republican Turkish Party
Minister of Finance	Birikim Özgür	20 October 2015	16 April 2016	Republican Turkish Party
Minister for Foreign Affairs	Emine Çolak	16 July 2015	16 April 2016	Republican Turkish Party
Minister for Health	Salih İzbul	16 July 2015	16 Nisan 2016	Republican Turkish Party
Minister for Agriculture, Natural Resources and Food	Önder Sennaroğlu	16 July 2015	20 October 2015	Republican Turkish Party
Minister for Agriculture, Natural Resources and Food	Erkut Şahali	20 October 2015	16 April 2016	Republican Turkish Party
Minister for Tourism	Faiz Sucuoğlu	16 July 2015	4 April 2016	National Unity Party
Minister for Tourism	Emine Çolak	4 April 2016	16 April 2016	Republican Turkish Party
Minister for Economy, Industry and Commerce	Sunat Atun	16 July 2015	4 April 2016	National Unity Party
Minister for Economy, Industry and Commerce	Birikim Özgür	4 April 2016	16 April 2016	Republican Turkish Party
Minister for Transportation	Tahsin Ertuğruloğlu	16 July 2015	4 April 2016	National Unity Party
Minister for Transportation	Asım Akansoy	4 April 2016	16 April 2016	Republican Turkish Party
Minister for National Education	Kemal Dürüst	16 July 2015	4 April 2016	National Unity Party
Minister for National Education	Salih İzbul	4 April 2016	16 April 2016	Republican Turkish Party
Minister for Public Works, Environment and Culture	Kutlu Evren	16 July 2015	4 April 2016	National Unity Party
Minister for Public Works, Environment and Culture	Erkut Şahali	4 April 2016	16 April 2016	Republican Turkish Party

On 19 October 2015, the cabinet was changed as three of the ministers from the CTP were replaced. Hasan Başoğlu, the Minister of Finance, was replaced by Birikim Özgür. According to Kalyoncu, this was due to Başoğlu's request for removal from his post because of his health problems. Önder Sennaroğlu, the Minister of Agriculture, Natural Resources and Food was replaced by Erkut Şahali and Aziz Gürpınar, the Minister of Interior and Labor by Asım Akansoy. Kalyoncu gave the reason for these replacements as "making the cabinet younger".
