= Killing of Emine Bulut =

Murder of a Turkish woman by ex-husband

The killing of Emine Bulut was the murder in 2019 of a Turkish woman by her ex-husband. The crime stirred public outrage in Turkey with condemnations of violence against women.

On 18 August 2019, Fedai Baran followed Bulut and their daughter into a café in Kırıkkale. Baran stabbed Bulut in the neck and then fled the scene in a taxi.

A video shows Bulut screaming "I don't want to die" and holding her neck after being stabbed as her ten-year-old daughter pleads for her not to die. Bulut died in the hospital.

== Incident ==
Bulut was having lunch with her 10-year-old daughter at a café in the northwestern province of Kırıkkale. Baran, whom she divorced four years prior, followed her to the café. Once there, he started arguing with her about the custody of their child. Baran later claimed that Bulut had insulted him.

Baran attacked Bulut with a knife he was carrying. The aftermath of the incident was filmed. The video shows Bulut screaming "I don't want to die" while her daughter was crying "Mum, please don't die!".

== Public reaction ==
Days after Bulut was killed, the video was shared on social media. Many social media users shared messages of "We don't want to die" and expressed their demands for an immediate end to feminicides.

The Ministry of Family, Labour and Social Services issued a written statement regarding the killing. The statement said Bulut's daughter had been placed under the supervision of the ministry's psychologists. It was also announced that a legal counsel had been appointed to prosecute Baran.

Gülsüm Kav, representative of We Will Stop Femicide, a women's rights platform, told the BBC: "The fact that her last cry was asking not to be killed is the symbol of how little, we as women, want. In Turkey, our demand as women, is not to be killed. This was Emine's last cry. And the fact that her child cried 'Mum don't die'… I don't think anyone in the world can turn a blind eye to it whatever their world view." According to We Will Stop Femicide, 31 women were killed in July alone.

People associated with human rights groups carried out protests across the country in solidarity with her.

== Trial ==
The Kırıkkale Criminal Court found 43-year-old Baran guilty of "killing with malicious intent" and sentenced him to life imprisonment, state-run Anadolu New Agency reported. The court rejected Baran's lawyer's requests for a reduction, it said.

Bulut's mother and father, her siblings, bar representatives from 81 provinces, representatives of non-governmental organisations and women's associations attended the second hearing in the case, Anadolu said. The mayor of Istanbul, Ekrem İmamoğlu, wrote on his Twitter: "We lost Emine Bulut because of male violence. We stand by women and children in the fight against violence and we will continue to."

A message from the Beşiktaş football team said: "We are not silent against this savage. We wish the killings of women to come to an end and the perpetrators will be tried with the most severe penalties. We won't get used to it, we won't shut up."

== See also ==
- Women in Turkey
- Crime in Turkey
