= Turkish Cultural Foundation =

- Formation: 2000
- Type: Charitable Foundation
- Location: Washington D.C., Boston, Sonoma, Istanbul
- Revenue: $28,626 (2015)
- Expenses: $1,892,260 (2015)
- Website: http://www.turkishculturalfoundation.org

The Turkish Cultural Foundation promotes and preserves Turkish culture and heritage worldwide, and places special emphasis on education for disadvantaged students in Turkey and abroad. Created in 2000, the Foundation seeks to help build cultural bridges between Turkey and other countries in order to support a better understanding and appreciation of Turkish cultural heritage. To do this, the Foundation coordinates a series of people-to-people cultural exchanges, educational programs, and websites promoting Turkish music, art, and cuisine. As a US tax-exempt public charitable organization, the Foundation is supported entirely by private donations and has offices in Boston, Istanbul, Sonoma and Washington, DC.

== Projects ==
=== Promoting Turkish culture on the Web ===
The Turkish Cultural Foundation contributes to the worldwide promotion of Turkish culture via its three main educational websites. The TCF portals received over 1.7 million visitors from 204 countries and territories in 2010. The Foundation's Turkish Culture Portal highlights some of the distinct characteristics and qualities of Turkish culture and its contributions to human work. The website is intended as a casual and entertaining walk through topics related to Turkey's rich culture. Its content will always be a work in progress given the depth and the multiple dimensions of the subject.

Likewise, the Foundation's Turkish Music Portal is the first public educational website dedicated to Turkish music and was inaugurated in January 2006. The Turkish Music Portal explores the history, reviews the instruments of Turkish classical folk music, and introduces the composers and performers of all types of Turkish music. It is available in Turkish, English, French, and German. Similarly, the Foundation's Turkish Cuisine Portal is a rich resource featuring the many different aspects of Turkey's diverse culinary culture, including history, sociology, beliefs, ingredients, techniques, and recipes.

For those who want to bring a piece of Turkish culture home, the Foundation's Turkish Culture Shop promotes Turkey's diverse and unique cultural and artistic products, as well as providing access to a sampling of Turkish food items. All proceeds from sales go toward projects, scholarships and gifts. Available for online purchase are books, music gourmet products, handicrafts and art work.

In 2010, the Foundation established a portal for the TCF Natural Dye Research and Development Laboratory – DATU. The DATU portal, in addition to providing information on the institutional work of this new TCF initiative, makes a wealth of scientific knowledge on natural dyes available to the public. The portal also features an expansive database and images of plants, insects and other material used in the generation of natural dyes.

=== Educational projects ===
In order to promote interaction between the Turkish and American peoples, the Turkish Cultural Foundation has developed programs that encourage personal exchanges among different levels of society. One such program is the Foundation's series of Teacher Study Tours to Turkey. As a partner of the World Affairs Councils of America, the Turkish Cultural Foundation organized 13 study tours to Turkey for 348 educators from 2007 to 2011.

The study tours are part of a program with 18 World Affairs Council chapters nationwide and the Birmingham International Center, made possible through a grant by the Turkish Cultural Foundation, to educate teachers and the general public about Turkey. As part of this program, TCF has sponsored and helped organize 20 workshops for 638 teachers representing 241 schools. Since 2007, over 2000 American teachers have participated in the Teacher Workshops on Turkey program.

Additionally, the TCF-World Affairs Council partnership features public educational programs entitled Portrait of Turkey, designed and organized by the participating councils, Teacher Study Tours alumni, and TCF. The programs feature cultural events, such as book readings, festivals, and art exhibits.

Since 2010, The Turkish Cultural Foundation has been awarding major grants to the Birmingham International Center (BIC) in support of its Spotlight on Turkey series of programs. One such program is BIC's Arts in Education program, which provides resources to Alabama schools to incorporate Turkish art and culture into their curricula.

To help increase awareness of the artistic and cultural heritage of Turkey while also expanding recognition and outreach to Turkish artists worldwide, the Foundation initiated the "Who’s Who in Turkish Culture and Art" project, an online database of Turkish artists, artisans, and cultural experts in Turkey and around the world. The database covers artists from numerous categories, including visual and applied arts, traditional Turkish art, literature, music, theater, cinema, documentaries, dance, ballet, and opera. Likewise, the Foundation pioneered the showcasing of modern Turkish art at SOFA exhibitions in Chicago and New York.

In addition, the Foundation supports direct interaction of Turkish museum administrators, artists, intellectuals, and community members by hosting visiting art fellowships, lectures series in Istanbul and the U.S., and major Turkish festivals held in Boston, Chicago, Houston, Monterey, New York, Seattle, and Washington, DC.

=== Cultural and historical preservation projects ===
To help preserve hundreds of years of art, the Foundation created the Image Archival of Turkish Art, a digitalized slide repository of over 12,000 images of art. The archive was created from the professional image collection of Prof. Dr. Nurhan Atasoy, Art Historian and Senior Resident Scholar at the Turkish Cultural Foundation. Searchable in English and Turkish, the Image Archive of Turkish Art is accessible, for free, from the TCF Turkish Culture Portal.

In 2011, TCF established the YESAM Culinary Arts Center. Located at ARMAGGAN Nuruosmaniye, the mission of YESAM is to research, document and revive the tangible and intangible culinary heritage and traditions created by the Turkish people over the centuries on the expansive geographies they inhabited. YESAM will develop theoretical and practical educational methods to promote Turkish culinary culture in Turkey and across the world with a view to preserve this heritage for future generations. YESAM incorporates three conference rooms, a show kitchen and library. The show kitchen is designed for visitors to observe YESAM cooks preparing traditional Turkish dishes and desserts and is open to individual visits, as well as culinary tours.

Having identified shadow puppet theater – Karagöz - as one of the vanishing Turkish traditional art forms, the Turkish Cultural Foundation undertook the staging and filming of 20 traditional Karagoz plays, as performed by master puppeteer Metin Özlen. The project culminated in the release of "Turkish Traditional Shadow Theater: Karagöz," a 5-DVD collection to preserve this traditional Turkish art form for generations to come.

In 2007, the Turkish Cultural Foundation was the lead sponsor of the XI. International Conference on Oriental Carpets (ICOC). The Foundation's sponsorship enabled the preservation and restoration of 118 antique carpets and their exhibition during the conference.

The Turkish Cultural Foundation has underwritten the creation of a database of Iron Age settlements in Turkey, as well as a database for the Seljuk Age cultural and architectural sites. Both projects have been developed and implemented by Turkish non-governmental organizations TAY Project and Foundation for the Advancement of Turkish Cultural Awareness, and are managed by teams of scholars. As part of the sustainable development project undertaken by the Global Heritage Fund, the Foundation was a major sponsor of the restoration of the Namık Kemal House and Cultural Center in the Eastern Turkish city of Kars. Additionally, the Foundation sponsored the excavation and preservation project at the Neolithic site of Çatalhöyük in Central Turkey. Dating back some 9,000 years, Çatalhöyük is home to the world's earliest mural arts and is pivotal to understanding the origin of civilizations.

== Related links ==
- Turkish Cultural Foundation Website
- Turkish Culture Portal
- Turkish Music Portal
- Turkish Cuisine Portal
- Turkish Culture Shop
