= Nurhan Atasoy =

Turkish art historian

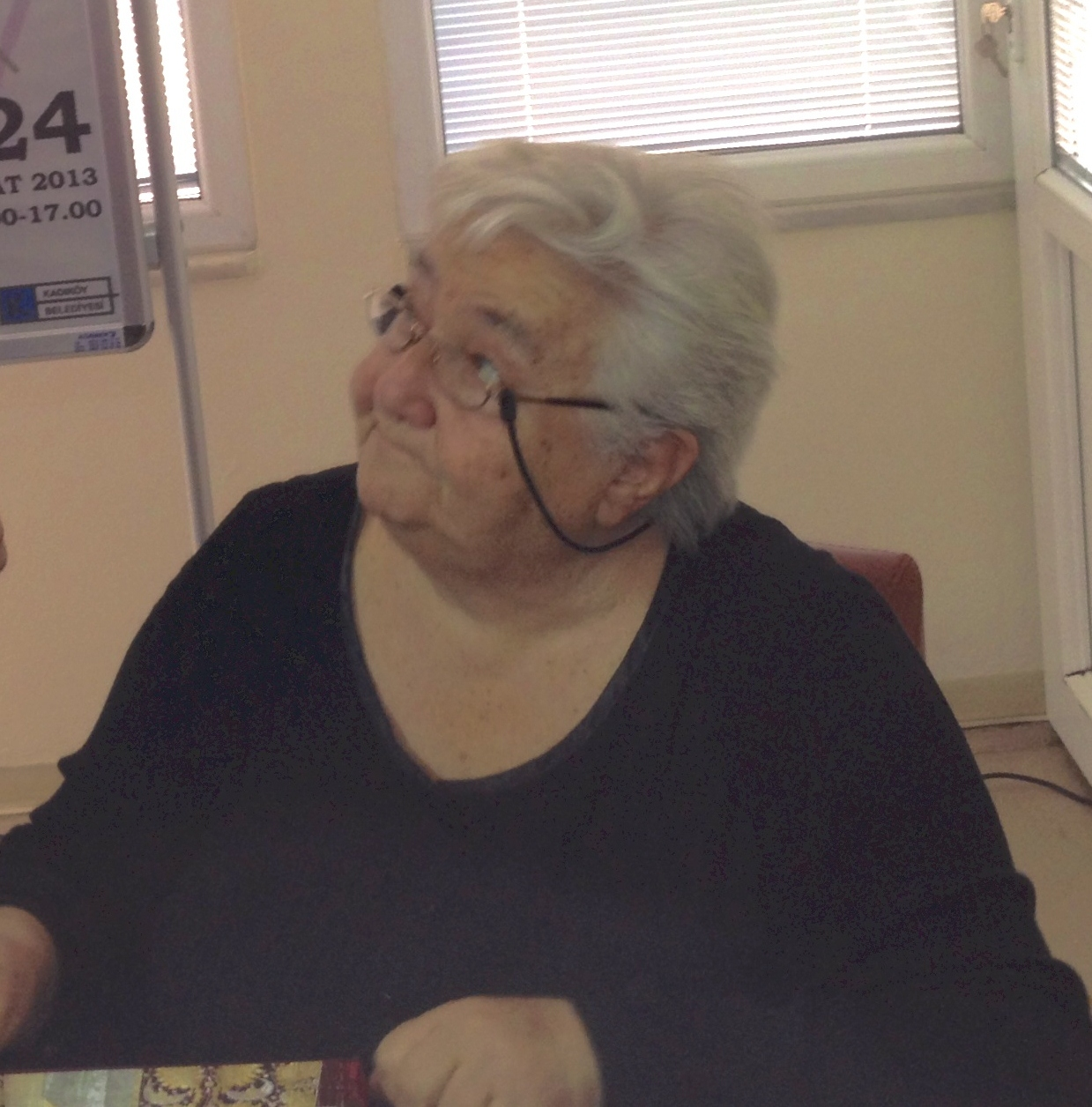
- Atasoy in February 2013
- Born: 12 February 1934 (age 92); Reşadiye, Tokat, Turkey
- Citizenship: Turkish
- Education: Istanbul University
- Known for: Research and works based on Ottoman and Islamic Art history
- Awards: Council of Europe, Strasbourg Pro Merito medal 1984; Memphis Municipality (U.S.A.), Honorary Citizenship, 1989; Economic Cooperation Organization award in recognition of outstanding performance in the field of Fine Arts, 1993; Award for the outstanding performance in Turkish Museum Studies and Archaeology, Ministry of Culture of the Republic of Turkey, 1993; The selection of "Otağı Humayun: Imperial Ottoman Tents", (Istanbul 2000) as the "Book of the Year" by the Textile Society of America and monetary award, 2000; Senior Fellowship of the Deptment of Landscape, Dumbarton Oaks, Harvard University, 2004; State Award for Superior Achievement, Harvard University, 2006; Turkey Government Award for Superior Achievement, 2008; Culture and Tourism Ministry Culture and Arts Special Award 2018 in the field of Art History
- Scientific career
- Fields: Ottoman Art History, Islamic Art history
- Workplaces: Istanbul University
- Thesis: Ibrahim Pasha Palace (1972)

Nurhan Atasoy (born 12 February 1934) is a Turkish art historian. She specializes in history of Ottoman and Islamic art. She served as a chair in the Department of Fine Arts, Archeology and Art History at Istanbul University until 1999 when she retired. She is a resident scholar of the Turkish Cultural Foundation.

Since 2012 she sits as a permanent guest on Tarihin Arka Odası, a TV program dedicated to history, with journalist Murat Bardakçı and historian Erhan Afyoncu.

== Biography and academic career ==
Nurhan Atasoy was born 12 February 1934 in Tokat, Turkey. Her family later moved to İstanbul, where she completed her primary and secondary education, graduating from Atatürk Kız Lisesi in 1953. Atasoy received her B.A., M.A. and Ph.D. from the Department of Fine Arts and Art History in the Faculty of Letters at Istanbul University. She served as a department chairman in the Department of Fine Arts, a department chairman in the Department of Archeology and Art History, and finally as a dean in the Faculty of Letters. She retired from Istanbul University in 1999.

== Publications ==
She is the author of over 120 books and publications, amongst them are Iznik: Ottoman Pottery of Turkey with Julian Raby (1989), The Art of Islam, (with Afif Bahnassi), (1990); 1582 Surname-i Hümayun: An Imperial Celebration (1997), Otağı Hümayun: The Ottoman Imperial Tent Complex (2000) and IPEK: Imperial Ottoman Silks and Velvets (2001), and Impressions of Ottoman Culture in Europe: 1453-1699 (2012). She is the recipient of the Turkish State Award for Superior Achievement and numerous international awards for her achievements in the field of Islamic art history.

She took part in numerous projects with various people and foundations. Some notable include:

- "Portraits of the Ottoman Sultans and Caftans; Nurhan Atasoy
- "Reflections of Ottoman Culture in Europe :1453-1699; Nurhan Atasoy; Armaggan Publications, Istanbul, 2012, 443 pages, English"
- "Ibrahim Pasha Palace, Nurhan Atasoy, Istanbul University. Faculty Publications, Istanbul, 1972, 15.5 x 23.5 cm., 189 pages, English, Paperback." •
- "Palace Grounds: Gardens and Flowers in Ottoman Culture, Book Publishing, Istanbul, 2011, 23 x 33 cm., 367 pages, English, Hardcover, şömizli, ISBN 9789757710110."
- "15th Century to 20th Century Ottoman Gardens and the Palace Grounds, Edited by: Arzu Karamani Beijing, the Ministry of Culture and Tourism Publications, 208, 2005, 24 x 29, 208 pages, English, Hardcovered, ISBN 9751731801."
- "Garden for the Sultan: Gardens and flowers in the Ottoman culture; Aygaz (Coach Publications)"
- "Dervish Dowry: In Turkey, the Priory's Clothing - History of Harness; Nurhan Atasoy Culture and the Ministry of Tourism Publications, Istanbul, 2000, 23 x 33 cm., 303 pages, English, Paperback, ISBN 9757510068."
- "Harem (Turkish); Author: Nurhan Atasoy, BMI Publications, Istanbul, 2011, 20.5 x 28 cm, 199 pages, Turkish, Hardcover, ISBN 9786055495060."
- "Iznik Ceramics (English), Julian Raby, Nurhan Atasoy, Alexandria Press (TEB) Turkey Economy Bank, London, 1989, 25.5 x 36 cm., 384 p., 991 images (303 in color) pages, Turkish, Paperback"
- "Palace Grounds: Gardens and Flowers in Ottoman Culture; Nurhan Atasoy, Book Publisher;

Istanbul, 2011, 24.5 x 34 cm, 367 pages, English, Hardcover, ISBN 9789757710110. "

- "Iznik: The Pottery of Ottoman (First edition), Julian Raby, Nurhan Atasoy, Alexandria Press (TEB) Turkey Economy Bank, London, 1989, 23 x 33 cm., 384 +783 picture pages, English, Hardcover, ISBN 9781856690546 ."
- "Ibrahim Pasha Palace, Nurhan Atasoy, the Ministry of Culture and Tourism Publications, Ankara, 2012, 25 x 32 cm., 243 Pages, English, Hardcover, ISBN 9789751736222."
- "Souvenir Album of Photographs from the Yıldız Palace Istanbul; Nurhan Atasoy; Akkök Publications, Istanbul, 2007, 20 x 27.5 cm., 356 pages, English, Hardcover, ISBN 9789750110511."
- "Turkish Miniature Painting, Scion Çağman, Nurhan Atasoy, RCD Cultural Institute Publications;

Istanbul, 1974, 23 x 33 cm., 107 p. +50 Plates miniature sheets, English, Hardcover "

- "Surname-i Humayun: an imperial celebration; Nurhan Atasoy; Koçbank Publications;

Istanbul, 1997, 35 x 50 cm., 136 pages, English, Hardcover, "

- "1582 Surname-i Humayun: The Wedding Book; Nurhan Atasoy; Editor: Jane Üçok; Koçbank Publications, Istanbul, 1997, 35 x 50 cm., 136 pages, English, Hardcover"
- ", The 17th and 18th centuries, European sanatıNurhan Atasoyİstanbul Univ. Faculty Publications, Istanbul, 1985, 15.5 x 23.5 cm., 210 pages, English, Paperback,"
- "A Garden for the Sultan: Gardens and Flowers in the Ottoman Culture; Author: Nurhan Atasoy, Kitab Publishing, Istanbul, 2011, 23 x 33 cm., 367 pages, İngilizce, Hardcover, şömizli, ISBN 9789757710103.
- "A Garden for the Sultan: Gardens and Flowers in the Ottoman Culture; Nurhan Atasoy; Editor: Rose İrepoğlu, Book Publishing, Istanbul, 2011, 24.5 x 34 cm, 368 pages, English, Hardcover, ISBN 9789757710103.
- "Anatolia History and Culture: Harem, history, Istanbul, the Ottoman Miniature Art, Hellenistic and Roman Period Anatolian city, Anatolia Tanrıçalarıİlber Ortayli, Nurhan Atasoy, Günsel Renda, Sumer Atasoy Prometheus Publications;

15.5 x 23.5 cm., English, Paperback. "

- "Dervish Dowry: History of Turkey Apparel sect; Nurhan Atasoy, the Ministry of Culture and Tourism Publications, Ankara, 2005, 24 x 31 cm., 311 pages, Turkish, Hardcover, ISBN 9789751731746."
- "From the Count Ostrorog to Rahmi M. Koç: The story of a Yali on the BosphorusNurhan AtasoyVehbi Koç Foundation Publications, Istanbul, 2004, 19,5 x 24 cm., 303 pages, English, Hardcover, ISBN 9759640724."
- "Harem (English) Author: Nurhan AtasoyBKG Publications, Istanbul, 2011, 20.5 x 28 cm, 199 pages, İngilizce, Hardcover, ISBN 9786055495060.
- "Iznik: The Pottery of Ottoman Turkey (New edition), Julian Raby, Nurhan Atasoy; Editor: Yanni Petsopoulos, Alexandria Press, London, 2008, 4th edition, 23 x 33 cm., 384 pages, English, Hardcover, ISBN 9781856690546. "
- "Silk: Imperial Ottoman Silks and Velvets; Nurhan Atasoy, Walter B. Denny, Hülya Tezcan, Louise W. Mackie TEB Publications;

London, 2001, 33 x 43 cm., 360 pages, English, Hardcover,"

- "Silk Ottoman Woven Art; Nurhan Atasoy, Walter B. Denny, Hülya Tezcan, Louise W. Mackie TEB Publications."
- "Company System Design; Author: Nurhan Atasoy, Nurhan Cangal, Nurhan Demirağ, Pelican Publishing, 2012-10, 160-240, 470 pages, English, Paperback, ISBN 9786055270223.
- "Count Ostrorog'dan a Bosphorus mansion, the story of Rahmi Koç; Nurhan Atasoy, Vehbi Koç Foundation Publications, Istanbul, 2004, 23 x 33 cm., 303 pages, English, Hardcover, ISBN 9759640732."
- "Otağ-i Humayun Ottoman tents; Nurhan Atasoy, Aygaz (Coach Publications), Istanbul, 2000, 23 x 33 cm., 305 pages, Turkish, Hardcover, Şömizli, ISBN 9756845066."
- "Otağ-i Humayun: The Ottoman Imperial Tent Complex Nurhan Atasoy Aygaz (Coach Publications), Istanbul, 2000, 23 x 33 cm., 305 pages, English, Hardcover, ISBN 978-975-6845-06-6."
- "Splendors of the Ottoman SultansNurhan Atasoy; Editor: Tulay Artan"
- "Relic-i Istanbul: Yildiz Palace photo albums; Nurhan Atasoy, Edited by: Jane Gideon Orkhon; Akkök Publications, Istanbul, 2007, 20 x 27.5 cm., 357 pages, English, Hardcover, ISBN 9789750110504."

•-This book was enlarged and re-published in 2012.

== See also ==
- Women art historians
- Emine Fetvaci
