= Suzan Emine Kaube =

Turkish-German writer, painter and pedagogue

Susan Emine Kaube
- Born: Emine Ese; 1942 (age 82–83); Pendik, Istanbul, Turkey
- Education: University of Istanbul; University of Hamburg
- Occupations: Writer; Painter; Pedagouge
- Website: suzaneminekaube.de

Suzan Emine Kaube (born Emine Ese; 1942 in Pendik, Turkey) is a Turkish-German writer, painter and pedagogue.

As a pedagogue, her works has dealt with cultural integration. She has made several exhibitions in Germany and Turkey.

== Works ==
- Tanz im Westwind oder du gibst mir erst Almosen, dann die Hölle (1999)
- Uyuyan Göl
- Tanz im Westwind
- Auf türkisgrünen Flügeln
- Heimlich und kühl
- Turkuvaz Kanatlılar (2011)
