= Emine Sare Aydın =

Turkish politician and academic

Emine Sare Aydın (born 1975), is an academic, politician and 27th Parliament Member of the Justice and Development Party.

== Life ==
Emine Sare Aydın who is originally from Bayburt was born in 1975 in Zonguldak. She finished her higher education in German Studies at the İstanbul University.

== Political career ==
In the 2018 General Elections, she was elected as the Justice and Development Party Istanbul Member of Parliament and is currently serving in that position.
