= Emine Çolak =

Turkish Cypriot lawyer

Minister of Foreign Affairs
- In office 16 July 2015 – 16 April 2016
- Prime Minister: Ömer Kalyoncu
- Preceded by: Özdil Nami
- Succeeded by: Tahsin Ertuğruloğlu

Personal details
- Born: 9 March 1958 (age 68) Nicosia, Cyprus
- Party: Republican Turkish Party
- Education: University of London

Emine Çolak (born 9 March 1958) is a Turkish Cypriot lawyer who served as the Minister of Foreign Affairs of Northern Cyprus in the Kalyoncu cabinet between July 2015 and April 2016.

== Early life ==
Çolak was born on 9 March 1958 in Nicosia. She studied law at SOAS, University of London and graduated in 1979, earning the right to work as a barrister in 1980. She started running her law office in Nicosia in 1982 and worked on several administrative, family, commercial, property and human rights cases. She worked as a lawyer on contract in the Department of Promotion.

== Career ==
Çolak founded the Turkish Cypriot Human Rights Association and was its chairperson when she was appointed as a minister. She served as a member of the Municipal Council of the Nicosia Turkish Municipality between 1994 and 2002, and coordinated the law commission in preparation for the Annan Plan for Cyprus in 2003 and 2004. She took part in bi-communal efforts beginning from 1990 and participated in the Turkish-Greek Forum in 2002. As part of her contribution to non-governmental organizations, she undertook work in areas of children's rights, women's rights, LGBT rights, rights of patients and rights of refugees. She is among the founding members of the Turkish Cypriot Association of Arbitration, Initiative against Homophobia, Association for Patient Rights and Association for Refugee Rights. She also served as the chairperson of the executive board of Sim Radyo. She was appointed to the High Judiciary Council by President Mehmet Ali Talat in 2007 and served till 2011.

Upon her taking office as the Minister of Foreign Affairs on 16 July 2015 in the Kalyoncu cabinet, she became the first female Minister of Foreign Affairs of Northern Cyprus.

== Personal life ==
Çolak has three children and speaks English and French.

Political offices
Preceded by Özdil Nami	Minister of Foreign Affairs; 2015–2016	Succeeded by Tahsin Ertuğruloğlu
