= Hasan Emini =

Albanian footballer

Hasan Emini (born in Kavajë, 1963, died in Jordanów in 2017) was an Albanian footballer who played as a defender for Besa Kavajë during the 1980s. He coached amateur Polish clubs Napravia Naprawa (now Unia Naprawa) and Luboń Skomielna Biała.
