= Emine Fetvaci =

Art historian and academic

Emine Fetvaci is an art historian and the Norma Jean Calderwood University Professor in Islamic and Asian Art at Boston College.

She was awarded the 2014 M. Fuat Köprülü Book Prize by the Ottoman and Turkish Studies Association for her book, Picturing History at the Ottoman Court.

== Works ==
- Picturing History at the Ottoman Court (2013)
- The Album of the World Emperor: Cross-Cultural Collecting and Album Making in Seventeenth-Century Istanbul (2019)
