= Life imprisonment in Turkey =

Life imprisonment in Turkey is a legal form of punishment and the most severe form of punishment. In most cases life imprisonment replaced capital punishment. Law 4771 of 3 August 2002 abolished the death penalty for peace time and replaced capital punishment with life imprisonment for 17 provisions of the Turkish Penal Code. Law 5218 of 14 July 2004 abolished the death penalty completely. This law provided that in some 40 provisions of the Turkish Penal Code and other laws such as the Law on Forests the death penalty was replaced by aggravated life imprisonment (tr: ağırlaştırılmış müebbet hapis cezası or müebbet ağır hapis cezası).

== New laws since 2005 ==
On 1 June 2005 a number of new laws such as a new penal code (Law 5237), a new code of criminal proceedings (Law 5271) and new law on the execution of sentences (Law 5275) entered into force. Articles 45 to 52 of the Turkish Penal Code (TPC) of 2005 divide sentences into strict imprisonment, ordinary imprisonment, and fines. Imprisonment is divided into aggravated life imprisonment, life imprisonment and termed sentences of imprisonment. Indefinite sentences besides life imprisonment and aggravated life imprisonment do not exist in Turkey.

The Law 5275 on the Execution of Sentences provides that prisoners sentenced to aggravated life imprisonment are held in rooms for one person and are allowed one hour of open air or sports per day. Under subparagraph c), prisoners serving aggravated life imprisonment may have their daily one-hour open-air exercise and sports period extended and may be allowed to engage in limited contact with prisoners accommodated in the same unit, depending on the risk factors, security requirements and the efforts and good behaviour they demonstrate in rehabilitation and educational activities. Under subparagraph d), such prisoners may engage in a trade or occupational activity considered suitable by the administrative board, if conditions in the place where they are held so permit. They can make phone calls of 10 minutes length every fortnight and receive visits of one hour's length every two weeks. The Committee for the Prevention of Torture (CPT) considers that the very philosophy underlying Article 25 of Law 5275 should be rethought. The decision whether or not to impose an isolation-type regime, in CPT's view, should lie with the prison authorities and always be based on an individual risk assessment of the prisoner concerned; further, the regime should be applied for as short a time as possible, which implies that the decision imposing it should be reviewed at regular intervals.

== Release of life prisoners ==
Life imprisonment in itself does not necessarily require a life prisoner to spend the rest of their life in prison in Turkey; except in cases of where "aggravated life imprisonment" is given. There are two possibilities for release: conditional release (parole) or presidential pardon.

According to Articles 107 and 108 of the Law on Execution of Sentences and Security Measures (Law No: 5275), life prisoners may be allowed to apply for conditional release, after serving their minimum terms in prison. The minimum non-parole terms are stipulated in the same legislation (Law No: 5275). According to this piece of legislation, the minimum non-parole term for a life prisoner is 24 years, whereas an aggravated life prisoner can be considered for parole after serving 30 years. Prisoners sentenced to aggravated life imprisonment can be paroled after serving at least 36 years, or 40 years if given more than one sentence. For those who are convicted of terrorist related offences and sentenced to aggravated life imprisonment, there is no parole, and thus they will spend the rest of their lives in prison unless they are granted the presidential pardon; which has been historically rare. In Turkey, however, parole is not mandatory, and if rejected, inmates can reapply every three years. All other people sentenced to terms of imprisonment can be paroled for good behavior after they serve two-thirds of their sentence, or three-fourths if sentenced in cases of terrorism or sex crimes, in prison. However, parole is only possible if the inmate made no violations of prison rules. For those sentenced to less than one year in prison, they can be released after serving half the sentence.

Both life prisoners and aggravated life prisoners can be pardoned or have their sentence reduced by the President on the humanitarian grounds such as illness or old age (Article 104 of Turkish Constitution).

Article 107 of the LESSM also provides that released prisoners are subject to a supervision period (tr: denetim süresi) that lasts half of the time spent in prison. Only after this period the sentence will count as being executed. Paragraph 16 of Article 107 LES provides that people convicted to aggravated life imprisonment for crimes specified in the Turkish Penal Code in volume two, section four on "crimes against the security of the State" in chapter four on "crimes against the Constitutional order" and chapter five on "crimes against national defence" the provisions on conditional release do not apply (i.e. they stay in prison until death). These same provisions apply for any cases of terrorism and these inmates are required to spend the rest of their lives in prison.

== Juveniles ==
The maximum sentence for those aged 15–18 for murder is 24 years in prison, with eligibility for parole after serving two thirds of the sentence. For those aged 12–14, the maximum sentence is 15 years in prison, with eligibility for parole after serving half the sentence. Parole is only possible if the juvenile has maintained good behavior, and has not violated any prison rules. Individuals not maintaining good behavior are required to serve the full sentence in prison. Life imprisonment may only be imposed for juveniles in cases crimes against the security of the state, crimes against the constitution, crimes against national defense, honor killings, and terrorism.
