= Kasbah Palace, Tangier =

Palace of the Kasbah
- Musée des Cultures Méditerranéennes
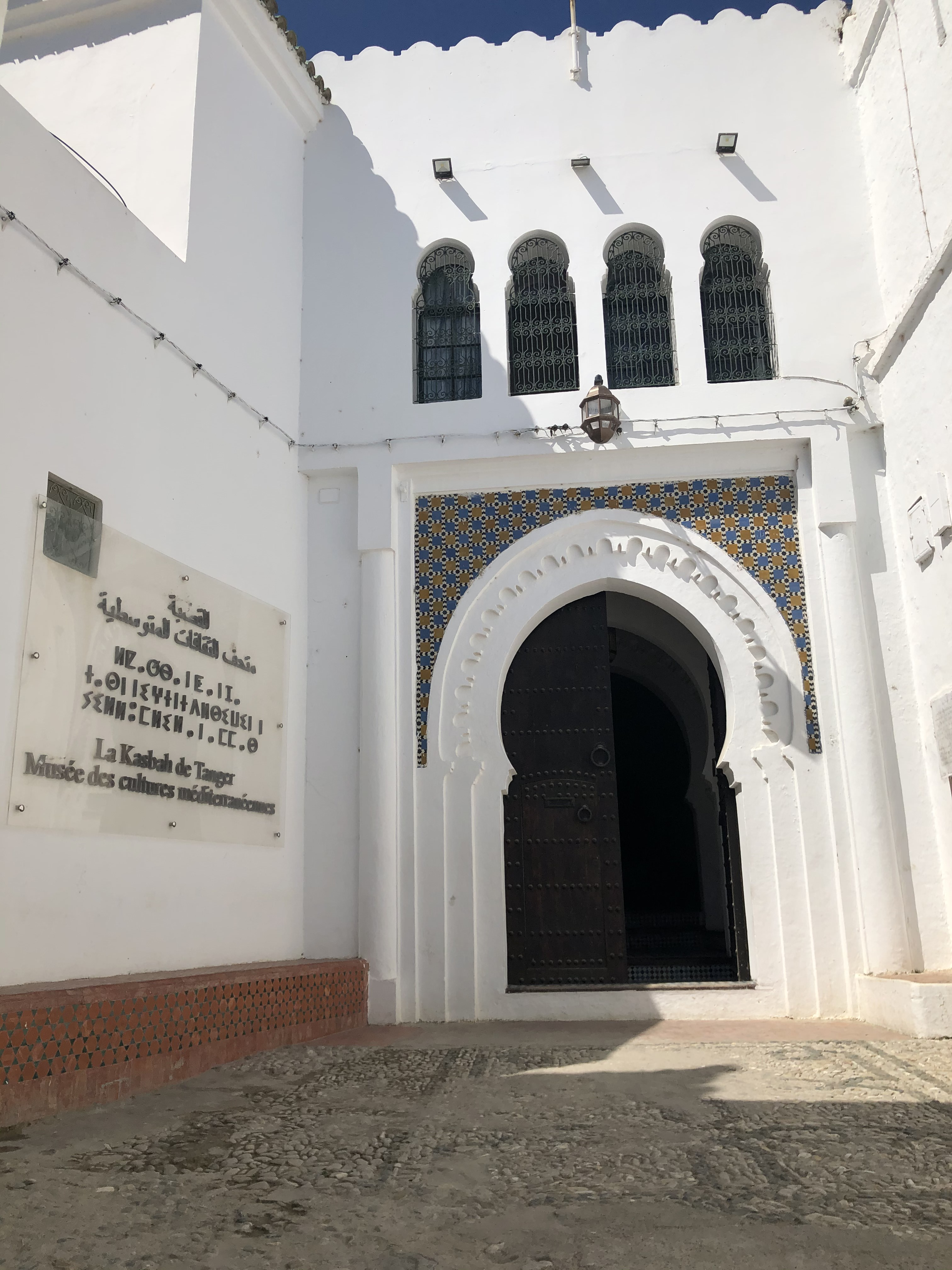
- Entrance
- Location: Tangier, Morocco
- Coordinates: 35°47′19″N 5°48′46″W
- Type: art museum
- Key holdings: Roman items, Carthaginian objects

The Kasbah Palace, also known as Dar al-Makhzen, Sultan's Palace or Governor's Palace and formerly as the Sharifian Palace, is a historical building and museum in the Kasbah or citadel of Tangier, Morocco. Its site has long been the main seat of political power in Tangier. The current structure was built in the early 18th century as the residence of the city's governor and home for the Sultan of Morocco when staying in the city, for example Hassan I in 1889. It has been repurposed as a museum since 1922, named the Kasbah Museum of Mediterranean Cultures since renovation in 2016, with the Kasbah Museum Contemporary Art Space added in late 2021. The palace stands on one of the highest points of the Kasbah, overlooking the medina and the Strait of Gibraltar, and is organized around two courtyards decorated with wooden ceilings, marble fountains and arabesques.

== History ==
The edifice was built during the reign of sultan Moulay Ismail in the early 18th century over the ruins of the English "Upper Castle". It was constructed by Pasha Ahmad ben Ali al-Rifi, general of the Jaysh al-Rifi and semi-autonomous governor of Tangiers.

In 1922, French scholar Édouard Michaux-Bellaire initiated the structure's transformation into a museum. It was comprehensively renovated in the early 2010s and reopened in 2016.

== Description ==
The building is situated in the eastern part of the Kasbah, on one of the highest points of the city overlooking the medina and the Strait of Gibraltar. It is centered within two courtyards, which are decorated with wooden ceilings, marble fountains and arabesques. The elegant marble capitals of the columns in the main courtyard were most likely imported from Italy at the time of construction in the mid-18th century. Dependencies facing the Kasbah's Mechouar include a former Bayt al-mal or treasury, created in the late 18th century, and prisons.

== Museum of Mediterranean Cultures ==
The former reception spaces and living quarters are now used by the Museum of Mediterranean Cultures (Musée des Cultures Méditerranéennes), displaying works of art from all over Morocco, amongst which are firearms decorated with marquetry, carpets, silks from Fez, and manuscripts. The Museum of Antiquities now occupies the former kitchen. It houses finds from ancient Roman sites as Lixus, Cotta and Volubilis, as well as a life-size Carthaginian tomb and finds from the Tangier region from prehistory until the Middle Ages.

The museum's Contemporary Art Space opened in late 2021 in the palace's former prison facing the Mechouar, which had remained in use until the early 1970s.

== Gallery ==
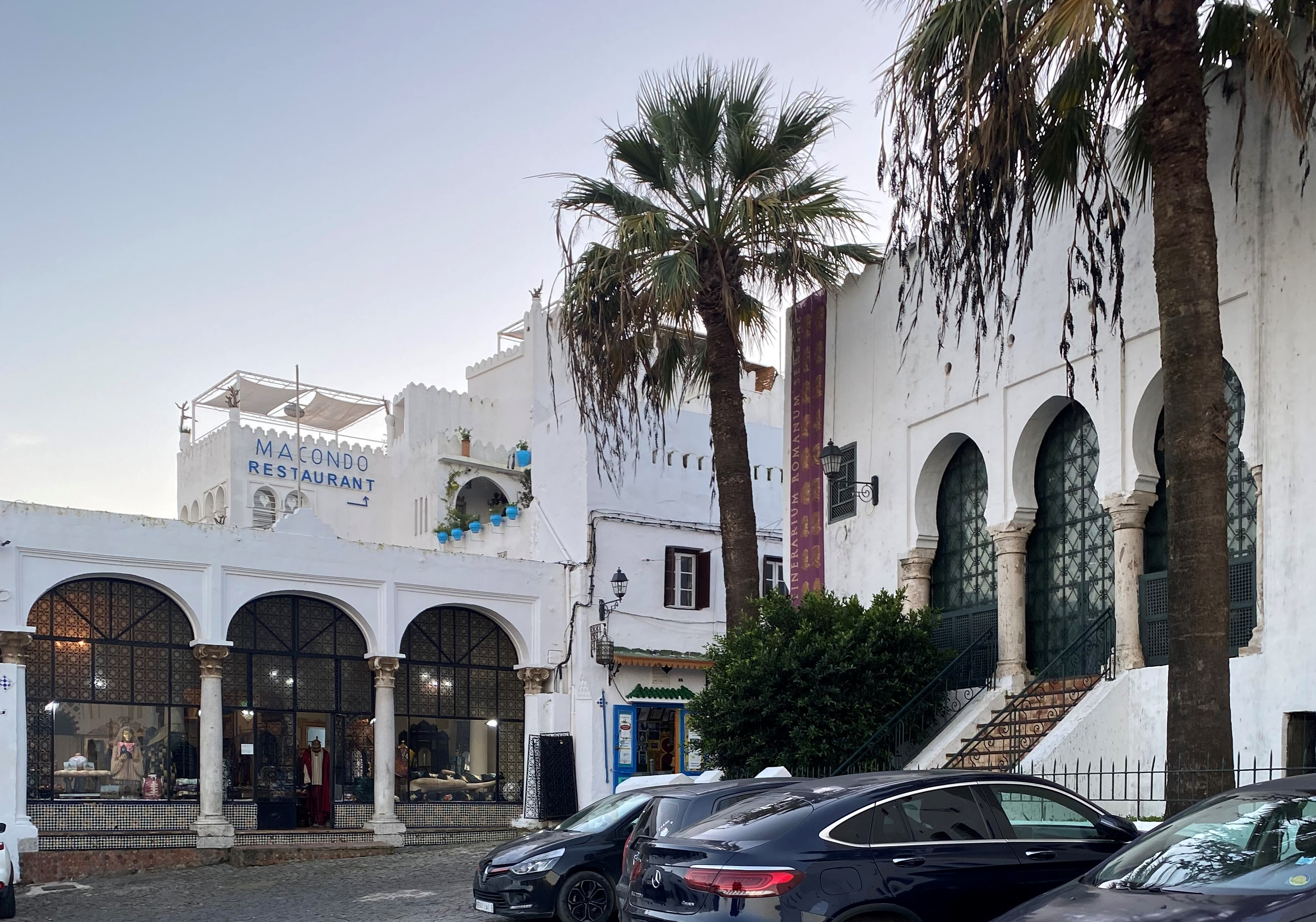
Former tribunal (left) and treasury (right) outside the Kasbah Palace

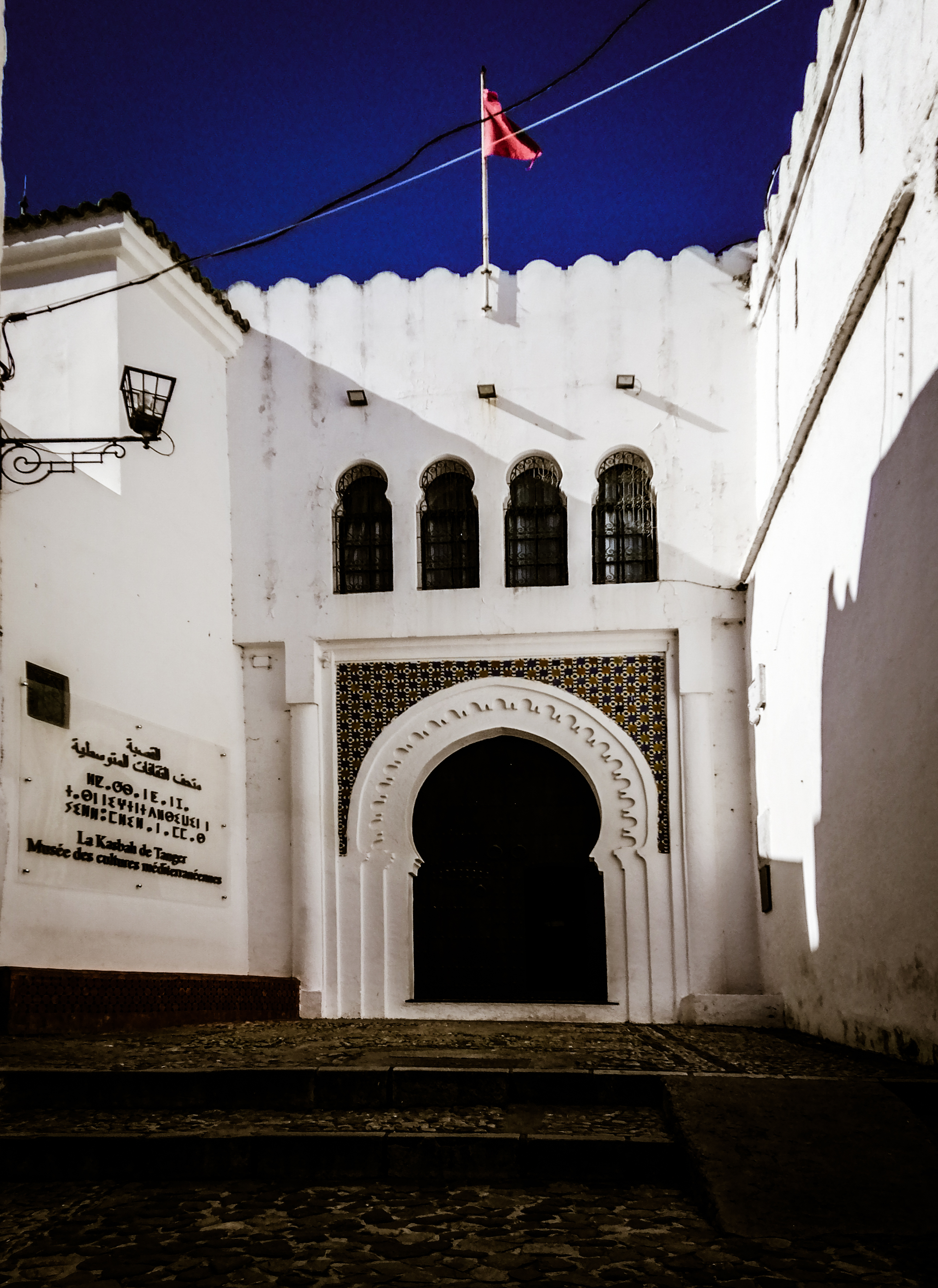
Museum entrance

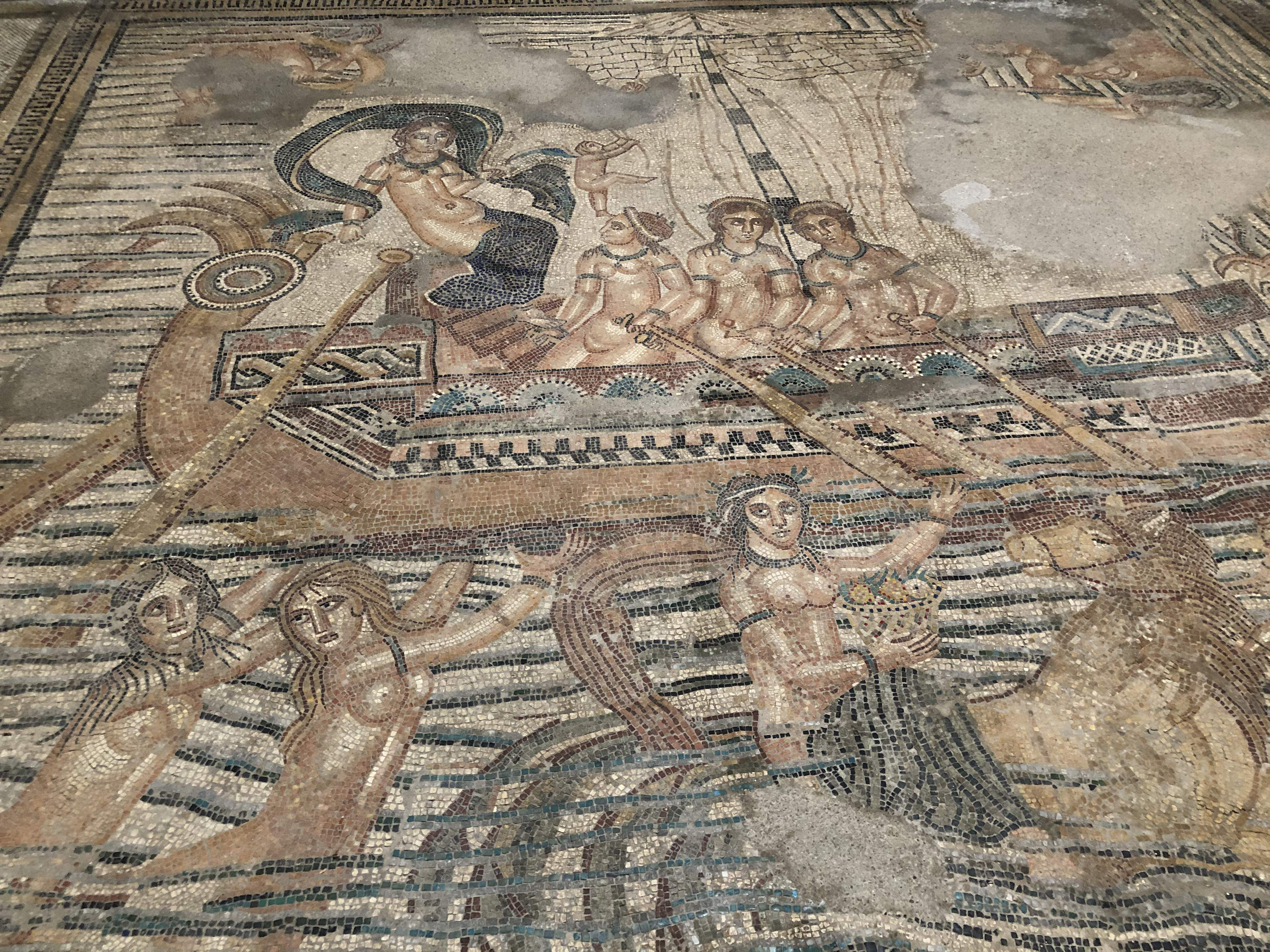
Roman mosaic

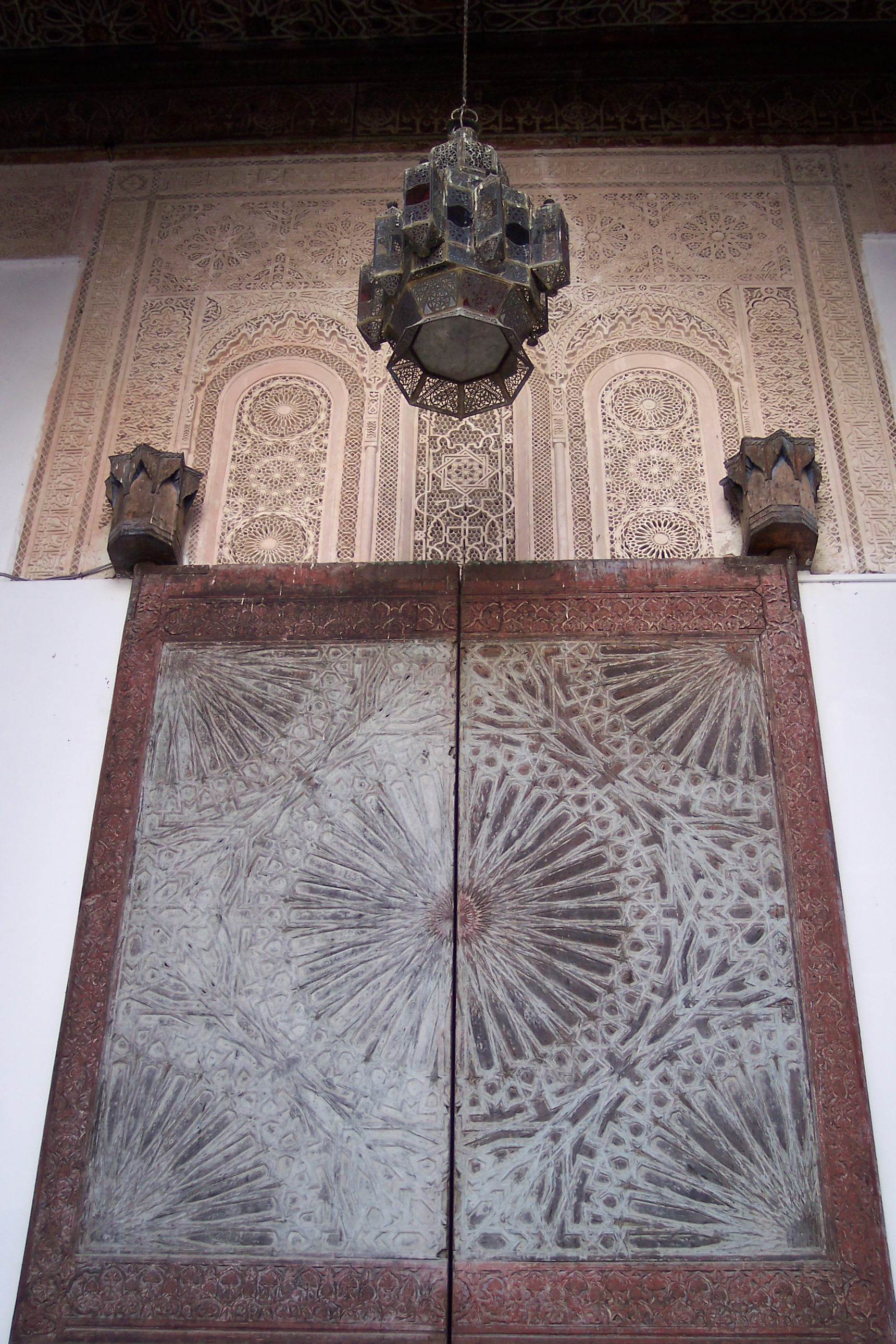
Doorway

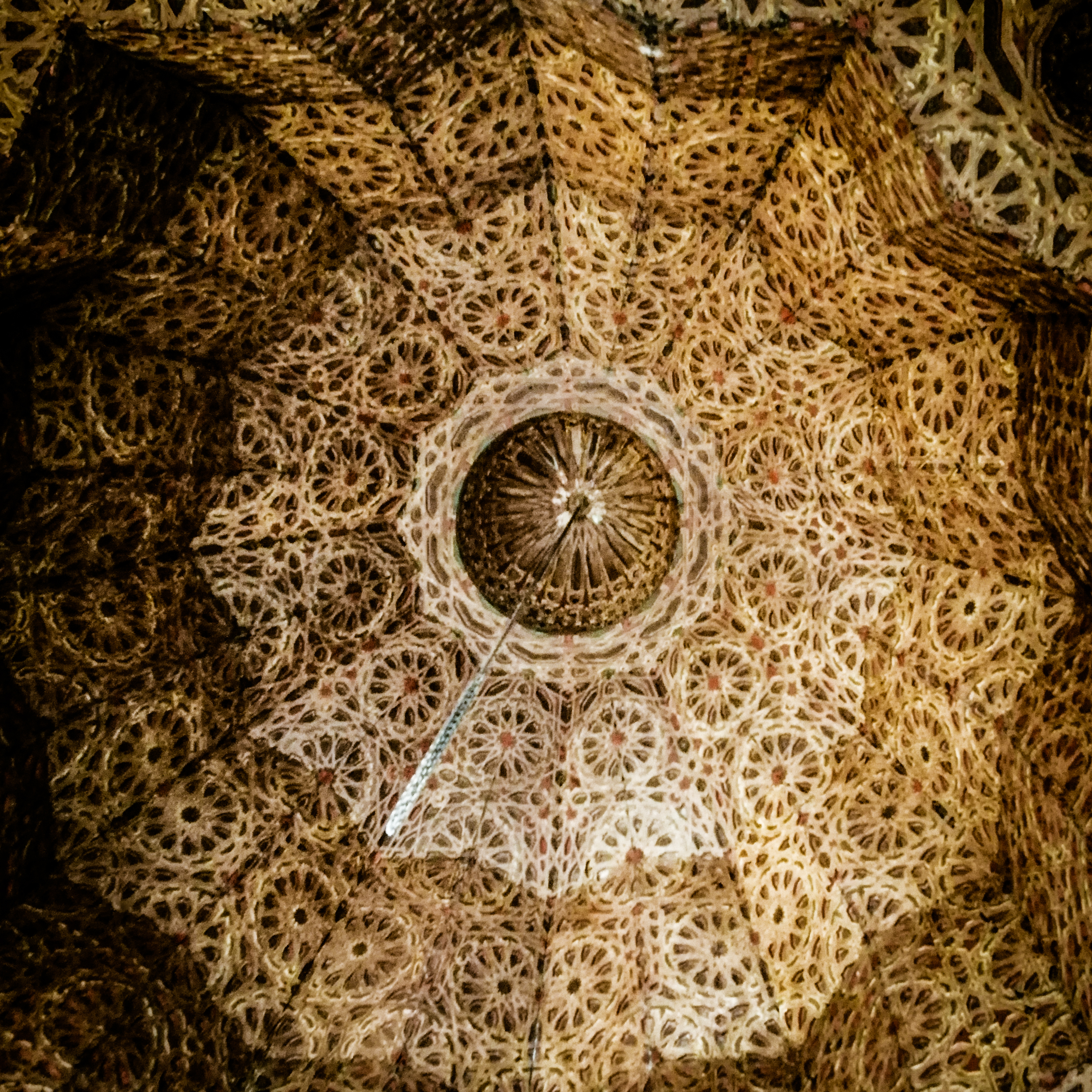
Wooden ceiling

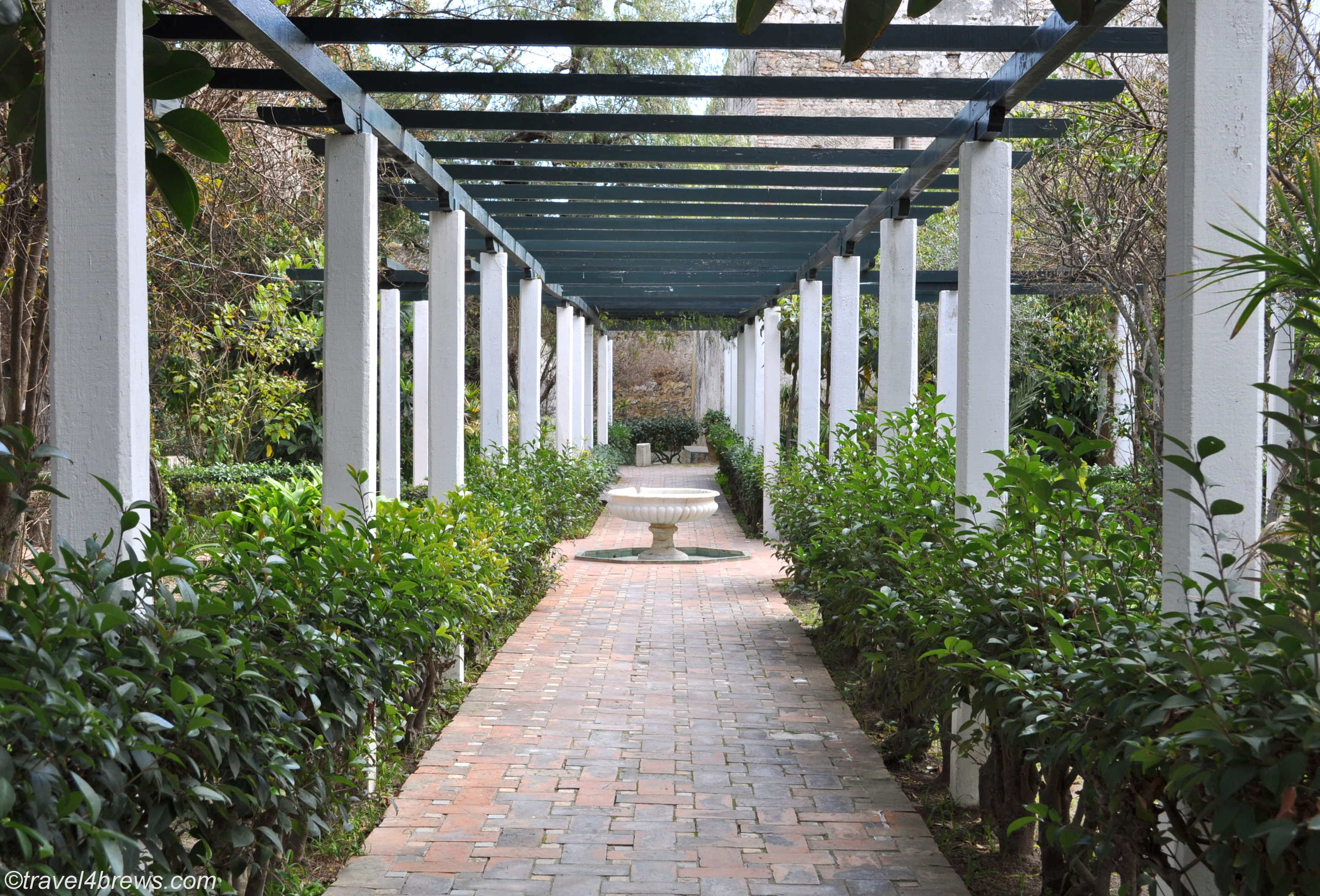
Palace garden

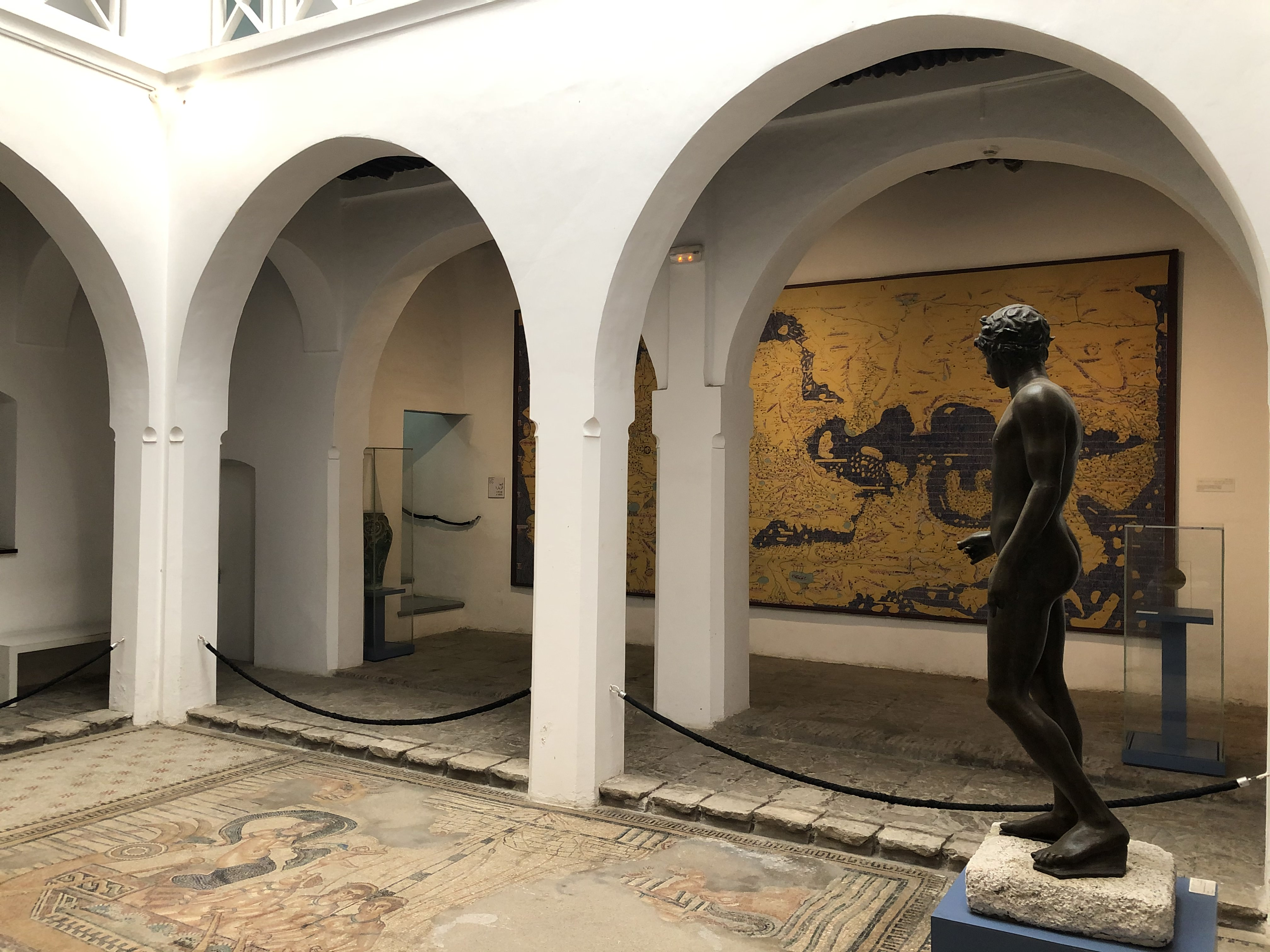
Courtyard

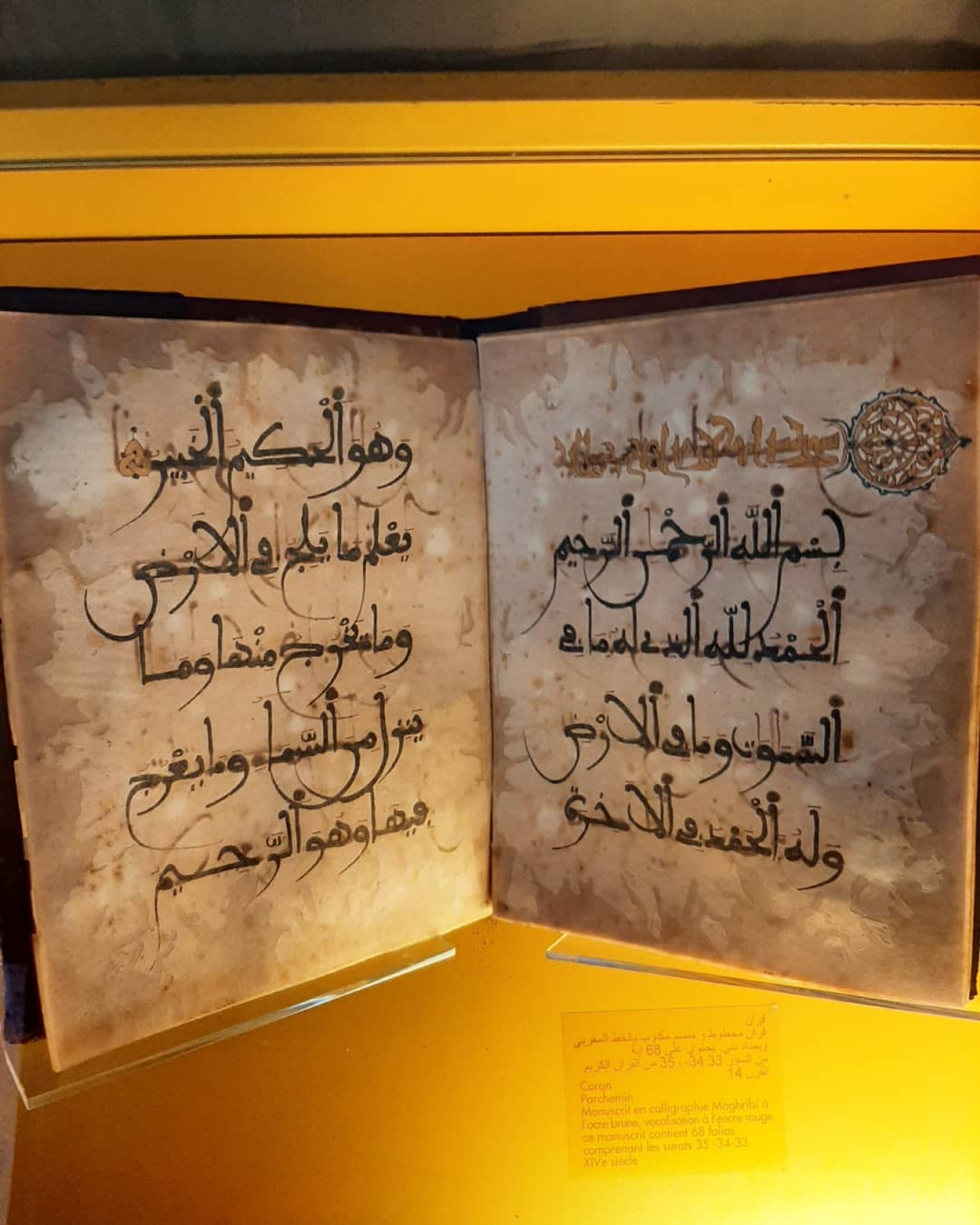
Almohad period Quran

== See also ==
- Kasbah Mosque (Tangier)
- Dar Batha
- List of Moroccan royal residences
