= Almohad architecture =

Period of architecture in North Africa and Spain

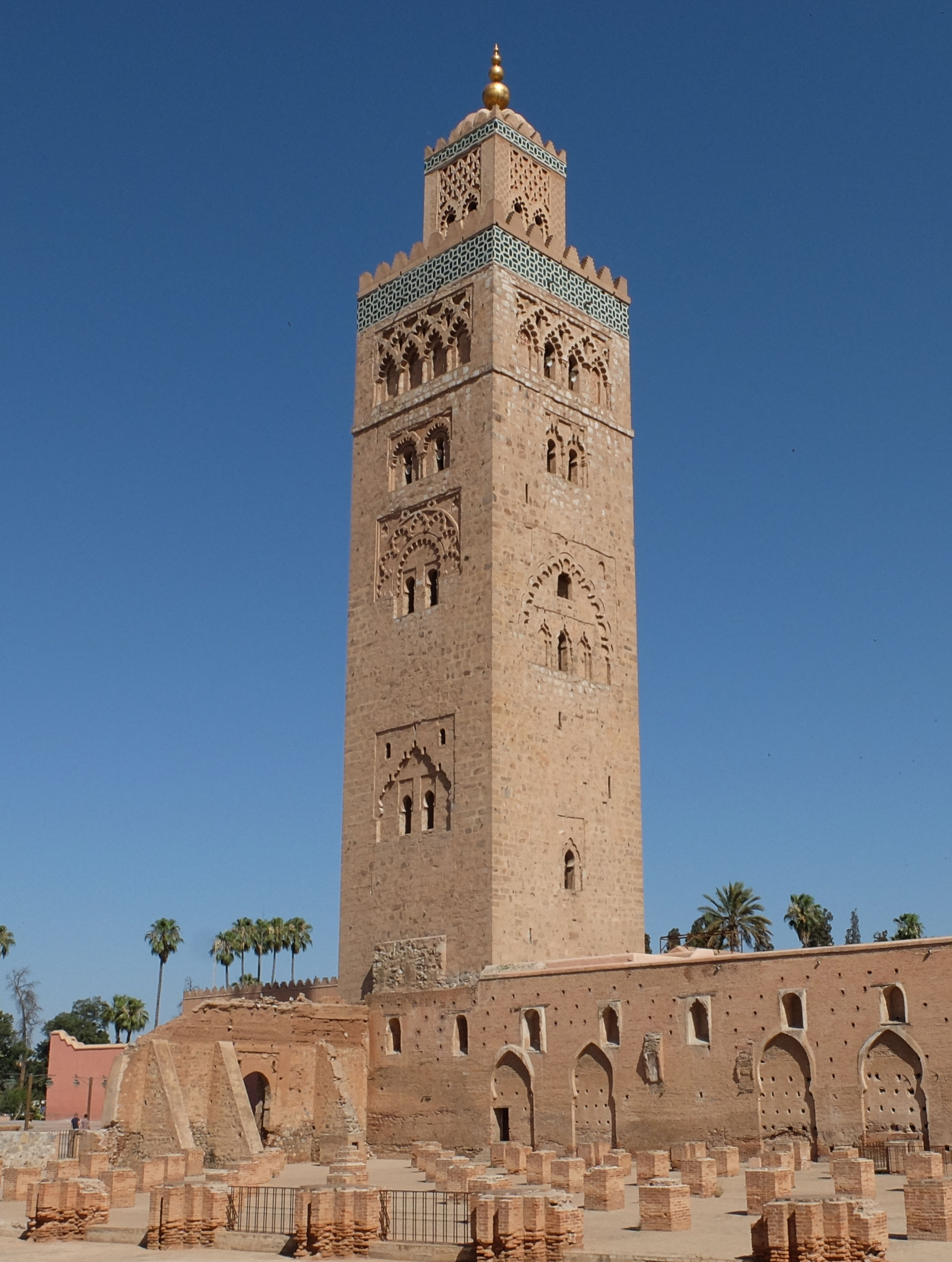
The Kutubiyya Mosque in Marrakesh (12th century)

Almohad architecture corresponds to a period from the 12th to early 13th centuries when the Almohads ruled over the western Maghreb (present-day Morocco and western Algeria) and al-Andalus (a large part of present-day Spain and southern Portugal). It was an important phase in the consolidation of a regional Moorish (or western Islamic) architecture shared across these territories, continuing some of the trends of the preceding Almoravid period and of Almoravid architecture.

== General ==
Along with the Almoravid period preceding it, the Almohad period is considered one of the most formative stages of Moroccan and Moorish architecture, establishing many of the forms and motifs that were refined in subsequent centuries. The main sites of Almohad architecture and art include Fez, Marrakesh, Rabat, and Seville, as well as important mosques in Taza and Tinmel.

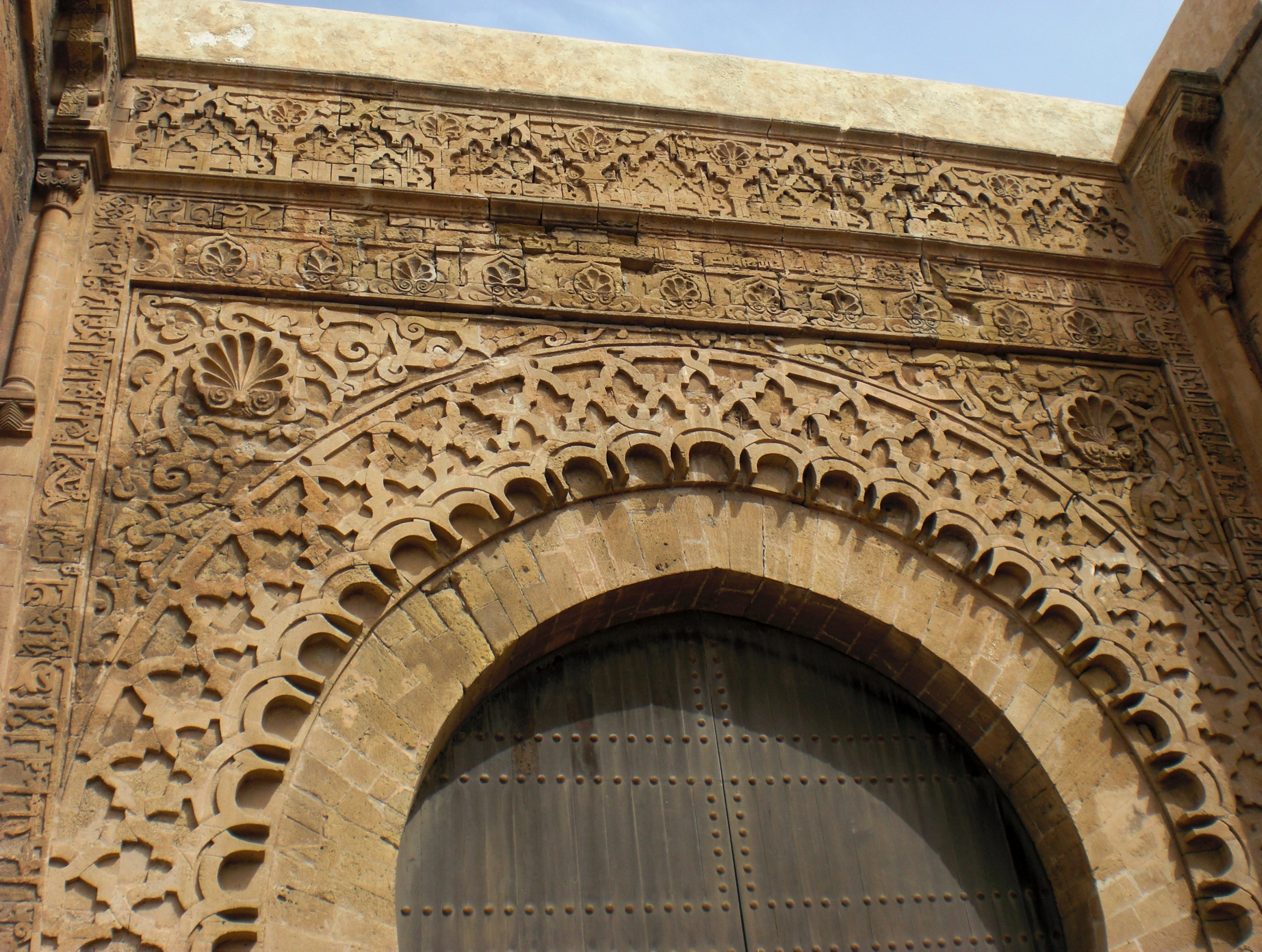
Example of Almohad decorative motifs in carved stone on Bab Oudaya (Rabat, late 12th century)

Compared to the earlier Almoravid period and the Taifas or Caliphal period in al-Andalus, early Almohad architecture was much more restrained in its ornamentation, focusing its attention on overall architectural forms and proportions, rather than on detailed surface decoration. Earlier motifs were refined and were given a grander scale. While surface ornament still remained important, architects strove for a balance between decorated surfaces and empty spaces, allowing the interaction of light and shadows across carved surfaces to play a role.

In addition to continuing the integration of Moroccan and Andalusi artistic traditions, some currents in Almohad architecture may also reflect influences from Algeria and Tunisia (Ifriqiya). Some Almohad elements, such as polylobed arches, have their earliest precedents in Fatimid architecture in Ifriqiya and Egypt and had also appeared in Andalusi architecture such as the Aljaferia palace. In the Almohad period, this type of arch was further refined for decorative functions while horseshoe arches continued to be standard elsewhere.

In general, Almohad architecture was built mostly in rammed earth and brick rather than stone. These two materials were relatively cheap, readily available at most sites, and already widely used in the preceding centuries. Almohad architects refined both the manufacturing process of these materials and their on-site assembly, making the execution of numerous and ambitious construction projects possible. According to scholar Felix Arnold, during the Almohad period "construction became an industry on a scale not seen since Roman times."

== Mosques ==
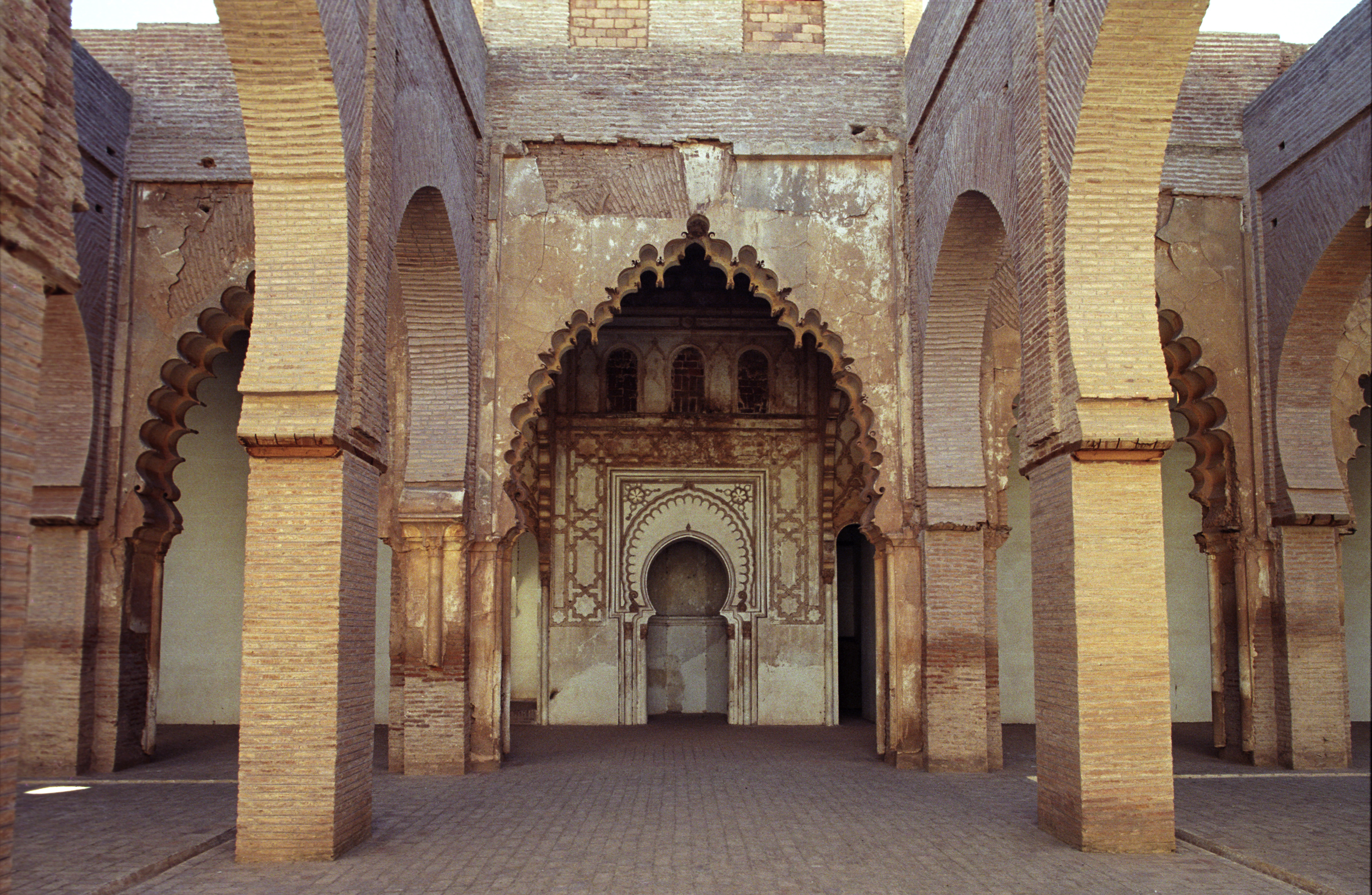
Interior of the Tinmal Mosque (1148; photo from 2007)

The Almohad Kutubiyya and Tinmal mosques are often considered the prototypes of later Moroccan and Andalusi mosques, although the Great Mosque of Taza (later modified by the Marinids) is the oldest surviving Almohad mosque (begun in 1142). Like earlier mosques in the region, Almohad mosques have interiors consisting of large hypostyle halls divided by rows of arches that create a repetitive visual effect. However, the aisle or "nave" leading towards the mihrab (niche symbolizing the qibla in the southern/southeastern wall) and the aisle running along the qibla wall itself were usually wider than the others and were highlighted with distinctive arches and greater decoration. This layout, already present in Almoravid mosques, is often referred to as the "T-plan" by art historians (because the aisle running parallel to the qibla wall and the aisle leading to the mihrab, perpendicular to it, form a "T" shape), and became standard in mosques of the region for centuries.

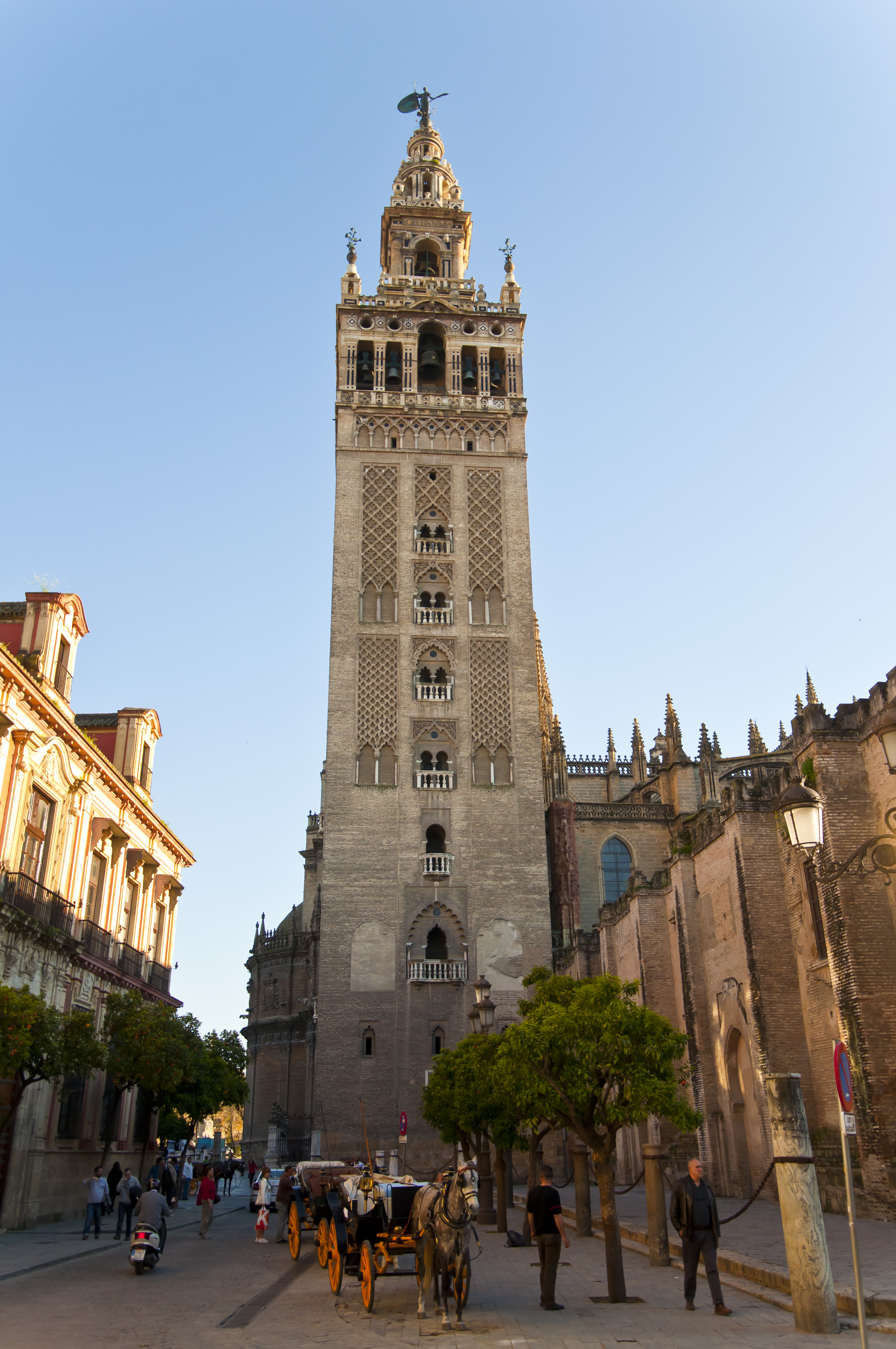
The Giralda in Seville

The minarets of Almohad mosques also established the standard form and style of subsequent minarets in the region, with a square base and two-tiered shaft covered in polylobed arch and darj wa ktaf motifs. The minaret of the Kasbah Mosque of Marrakesh was particularly influential and set a style that was repeated, with minor elaborations, in the following Marinid period. The most famous minarets of this time, however, are the minarets of the Kutubiyya Mosque (begun in 1147 by Abd al-Mu'min but subsequently rebuilt before 1195), the Giralda of Seville (part of a Great Mosque begun in 1171 by Abu Ya'qub Yusuf), and the unfinished "Hassan Tower" of Rabat (part of a huge mosque begun by Abu Yusuf Ya'qub al-Mansur in 1191 but never completed).

== Palaces ==
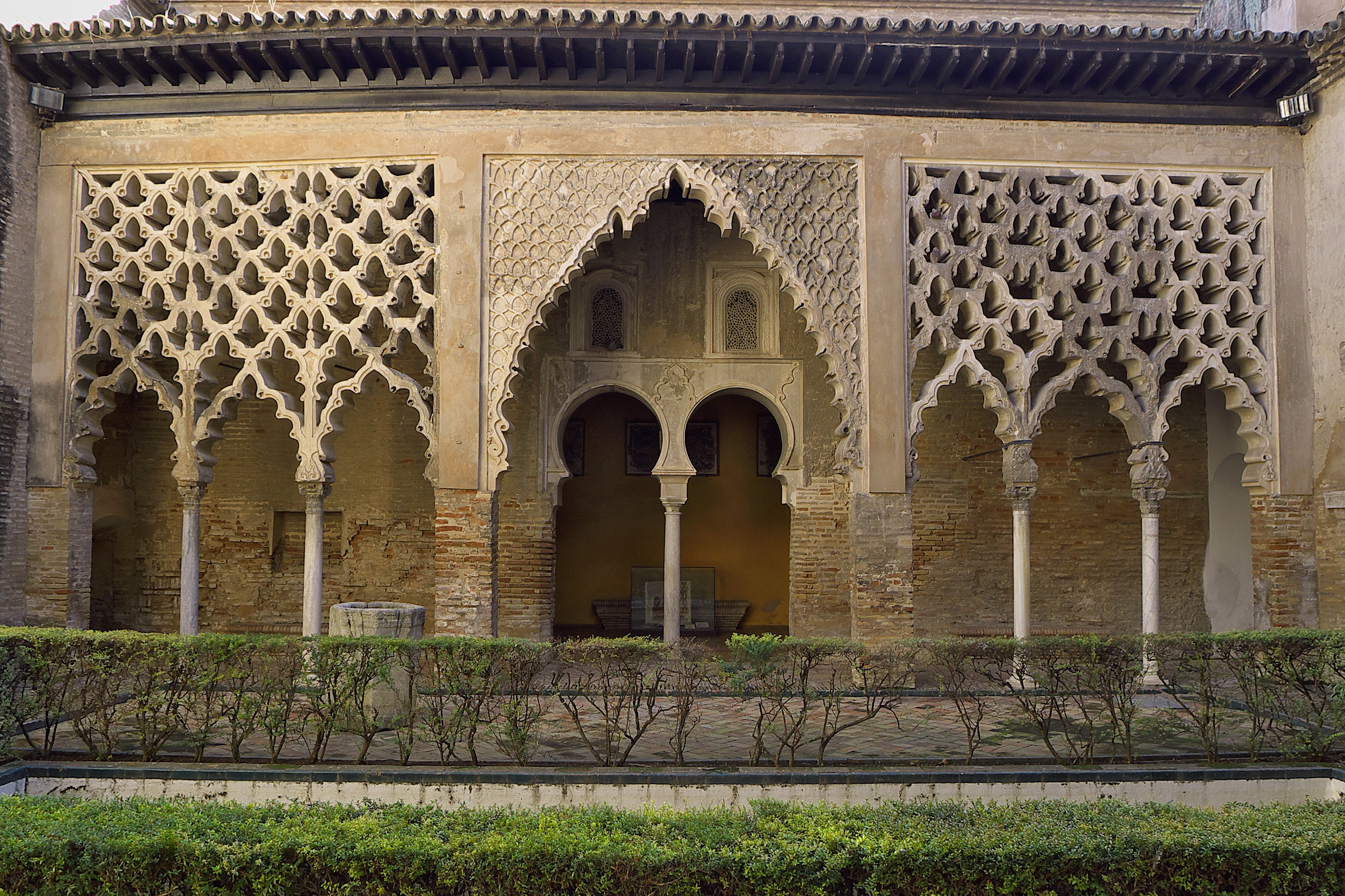
The south portico of the Patio del Yeso in the Alcázar of Seville, dating from the Almohad period

Al-Mansur created the Kasbah of Marrakesh, a large royal citadel and palace complex to house the caliph's family and administration. The main public entrance of this kasbah was the ornamental gate of Bab Agnaou.

The Almohad caliphs also constructed multiple country estates just outside the main cities where they resided, continuing a tradition that existed under the Almoravids. The best-known examples of these estates were centered around large water basins or reservoirs that sustained orchards of fruit trees and other plants. Some of them are referred to as al-Buḥayra ("little sea") in Arabic sources, likely in reference to these artificial lakes. Small palaces or pleasure pavilions were built on the edge of the reservoirs. In Marrakesh, the present-day Agdal and Menara gardens both developed from such Almohad creations. In Seville, the remains of the al-Buḥayra garden, founded in 1171, were excavated and partly restored in the 1970s. A similar garden estate was also created in Rabat but has not been found by archaeologists. The Alcázar Genil (originally called al-Qaṣr as-Sayyid) in Granada, created in the late Almohad period and later remodeled by the Nasrids, stood next to an enormous pool on the outskirts of the city. A small ribat, consisting of a square hall covered by a sixteen-sided dome on squinches, was built nearby at the same time and has been preserved today as a Christian hermitage.

Sunken gardens were also part of Almohad palace architecture. In some cases the gardens were divided symmetrically into four parts, much like a riyad garden. Examples of these have been found in several courtyards in the Alcázar of Seville, where former Almohad palaces once stood.

== Fortifications ==
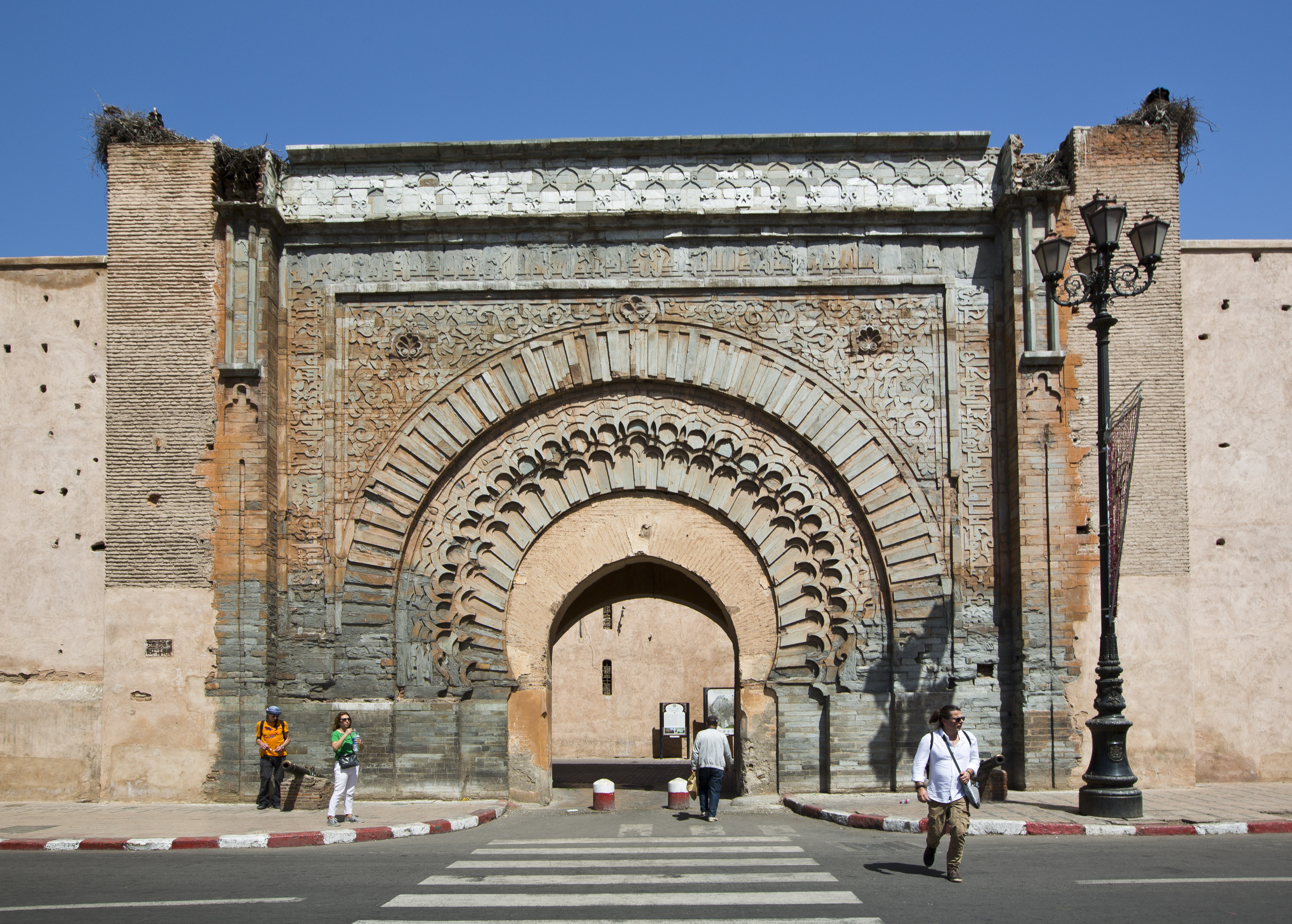
Bab Agnaou (1188–1190), the main public gate of the Kasbah of Marrakesh

The Almohads were also prolific builders of fortifications and forts across their realm. They were responsible for building (or rebuilding) the city walls of Córdoba, Seville, Fez, and Taza, as well as many smaller forts and castles across Morocco and southern Spain and Portugal. In Rabat, Abd al-Mu'min built most of the current Kasbah of the Udayas in 1150–1151 (after having destroyed an earlier Almoravid ribat there), while Abu Yusuf Ya'qub al-Mansur embarked on the construction of a vast new capital and citadel on its south side called Ribat al-Fath (for which the enormous unfinished mosque of the Hassan Tower was also intended). While never finished, this project created the current outer walls of the historic center of Rabat, along with multiple gates such as Bab er-Rouah and the ceremonial main gate of the Kasbah of the Udayas. In Seville, the Almohads built the Torre del Oro, a defensive tower on the shores of the Guadalquivir River which dates from 1220 to 1221 and remains a landmark of the city today. Likewise, the Calahorra Tower in Córdoba is believed to be an originally Almohad structure designed to defend the river and the city's old bridge.

The decoration around mihrab arches inside mosques also evolved into richer and more monumental forms in the great ceremonial stone gates of Almohad architecture such as Bab Agnaou in Marrakesh and Bab Oudaia and Bab er-Rouah in Rabat. These gates employed varying decorative motifs arranged in concentric semi-circles around the arch of the gate, all of which was in turn framed inside an outer rectangular band with other motifs. This style remained evident in Marinid gateways (e.g. the main gate of Chellah) and in later Moroccan gateways.

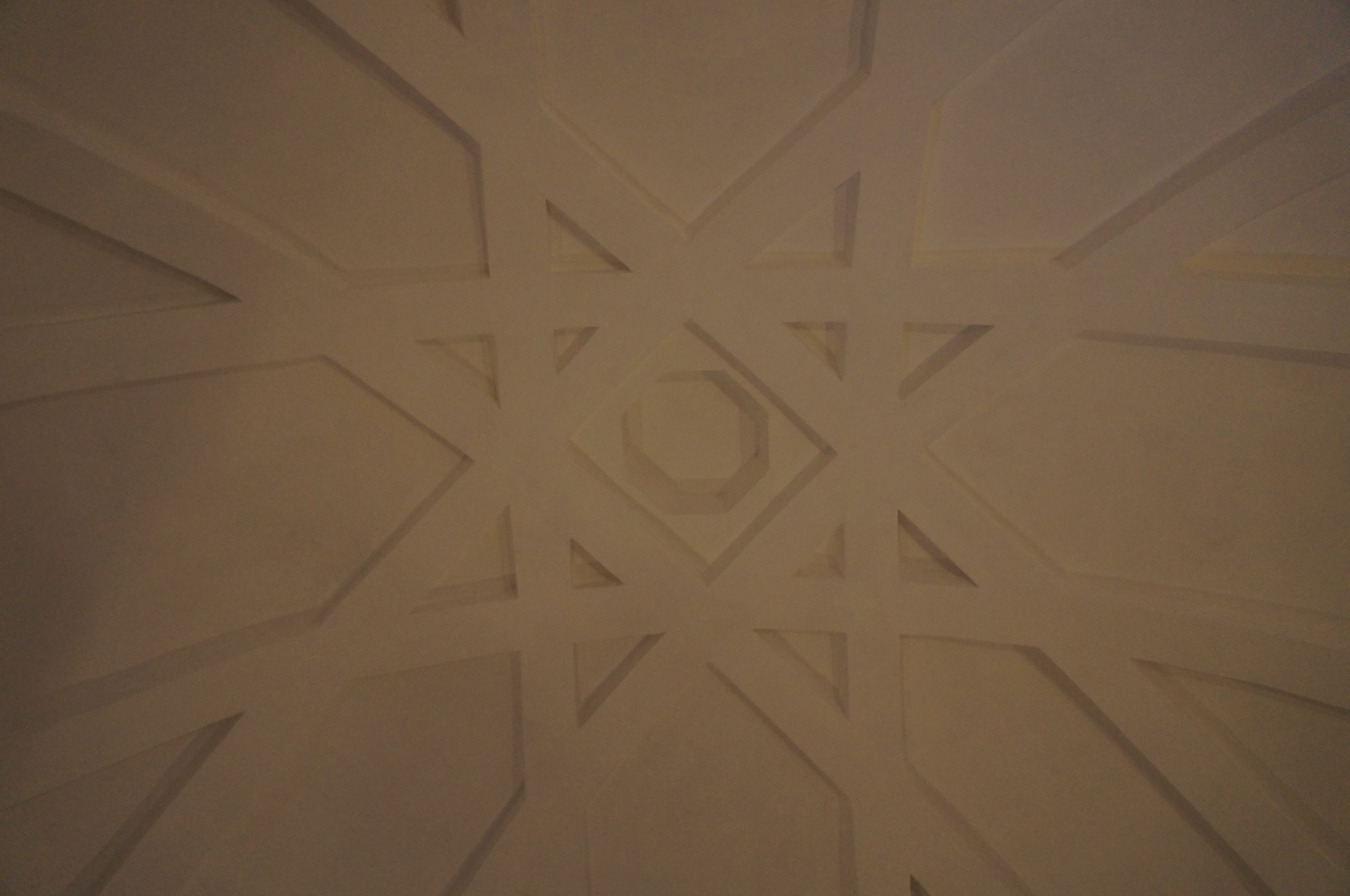
Ribbed vault in the Castle of Villena

The Almohads also made use of ribbed vaults to cover rooms in military structures, as exemplified by Almohad-era constructions in the castle of Villena. This type of vaulting had previously been used in religious buildings in al-Andalus, such as the Great Mosque of Córdoba and the Bab al-Mardum Mosque in Toledo.
