= Bab Agnaou =

- باب اكناو
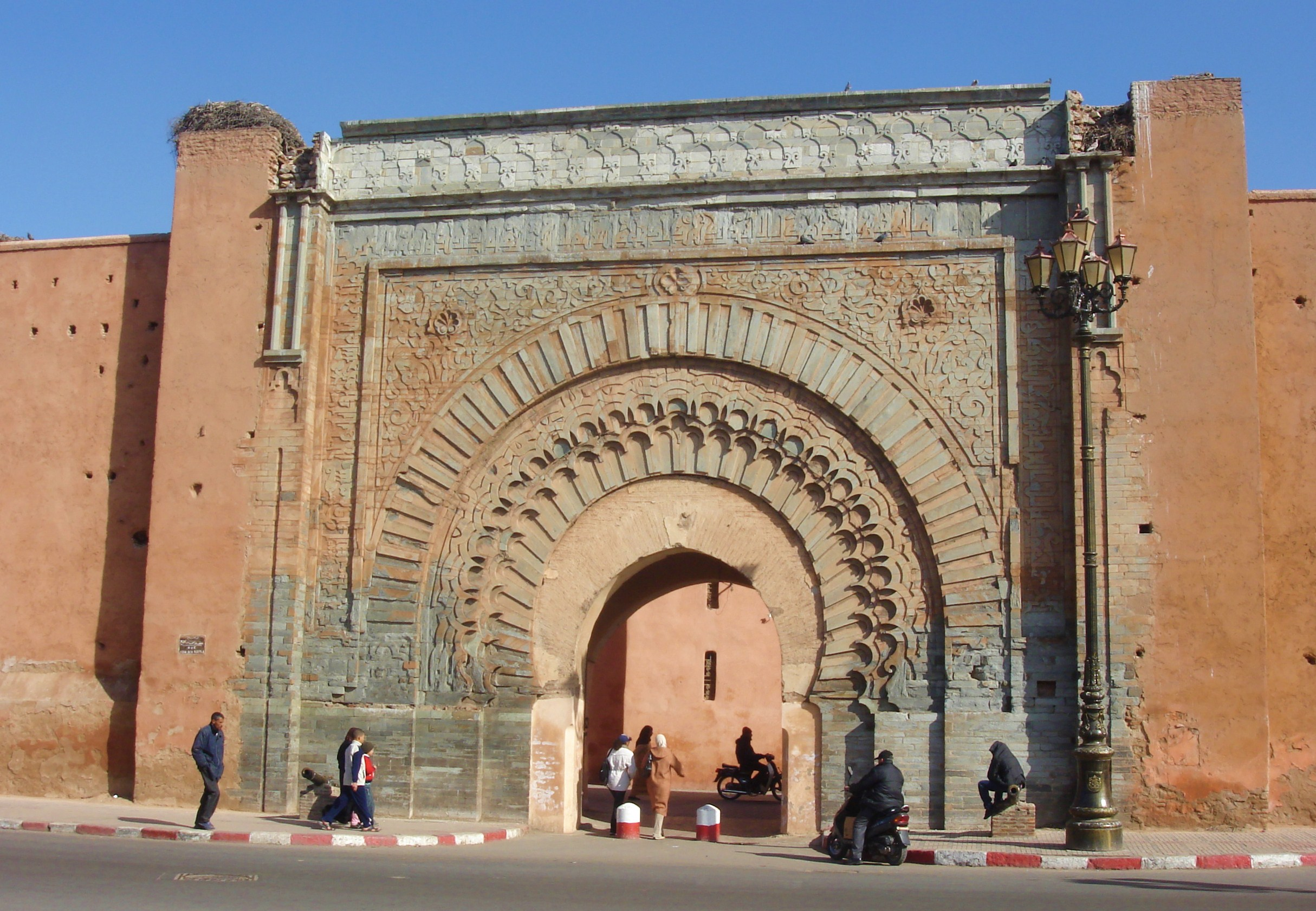
- Interactive map of the Bab Agnaou area
- Alternative names: Bab al Kohl, Bab al Qasr

General information
- Type: City Gate
- Architectural style: Almohad, Moroccan
- Location: Rue Moulay Ismail, Marrakesh
- Coordinates: 31.6175°N 7.9907°W
- Completed: 1188–1190

Technical details
- Material: sandstone, brick

Bab Agnaou (Arabic: باب اكناو or باب اڭناو), also transliterated as Bab Agnaw, is one of the best-known gates of Marrakesh, Morocco. Its construction is attributed to the Almohad caliph Abu Yusuf Ya'qub al-Mansur and was completed around 1188 or 1190.

The gate was the main public entrance to the royal kasbah (citadel) in the southern part of the medina of Marrakesh. The Kasbah, built by Yaqub al-Mansur, is the site of the nearby El Mansouria Mosque (or Kasbah Mosque) and the Saadian Tombs behind it, as well as the El Badi Palace and the main Royal Palace (Dar al-Makhzen) of the city.

== Etymology ==
The word bab (/bɑːb/, Arabic: باب) comes from the Arabic word meaning 'Gate' or 'Door'. The name agnaou is believed to be of Berber origin and had multiple historically reported meanings including "mutes" and, later on, "Black people" (or the Gnawa); however, it's unclear what exact connotation the name had in this case. It might also be translated to "a sheep without horns". The potential reference to the Gnawa might be explained by the fact that the gate is in the southern part of the city and faces partly southwards, thus away from North Africa and more towards sub-Saharan Africa.

The gate was also called Bab al-Qasr ("Gate of the Palace") and Bab al-Kuhl ("Gate of Kohl").

== Design ==
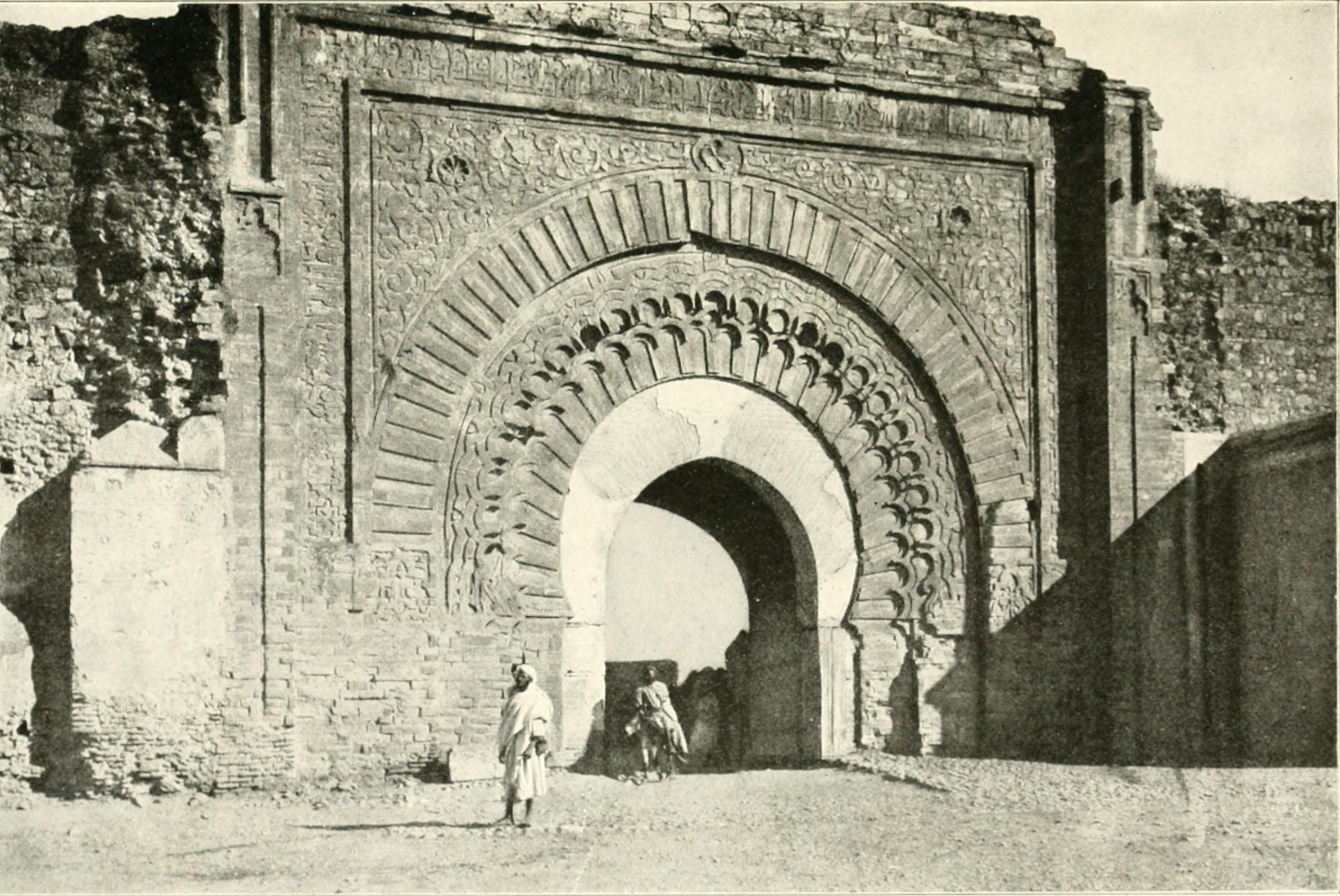
Bab Agnaou in the 1920s

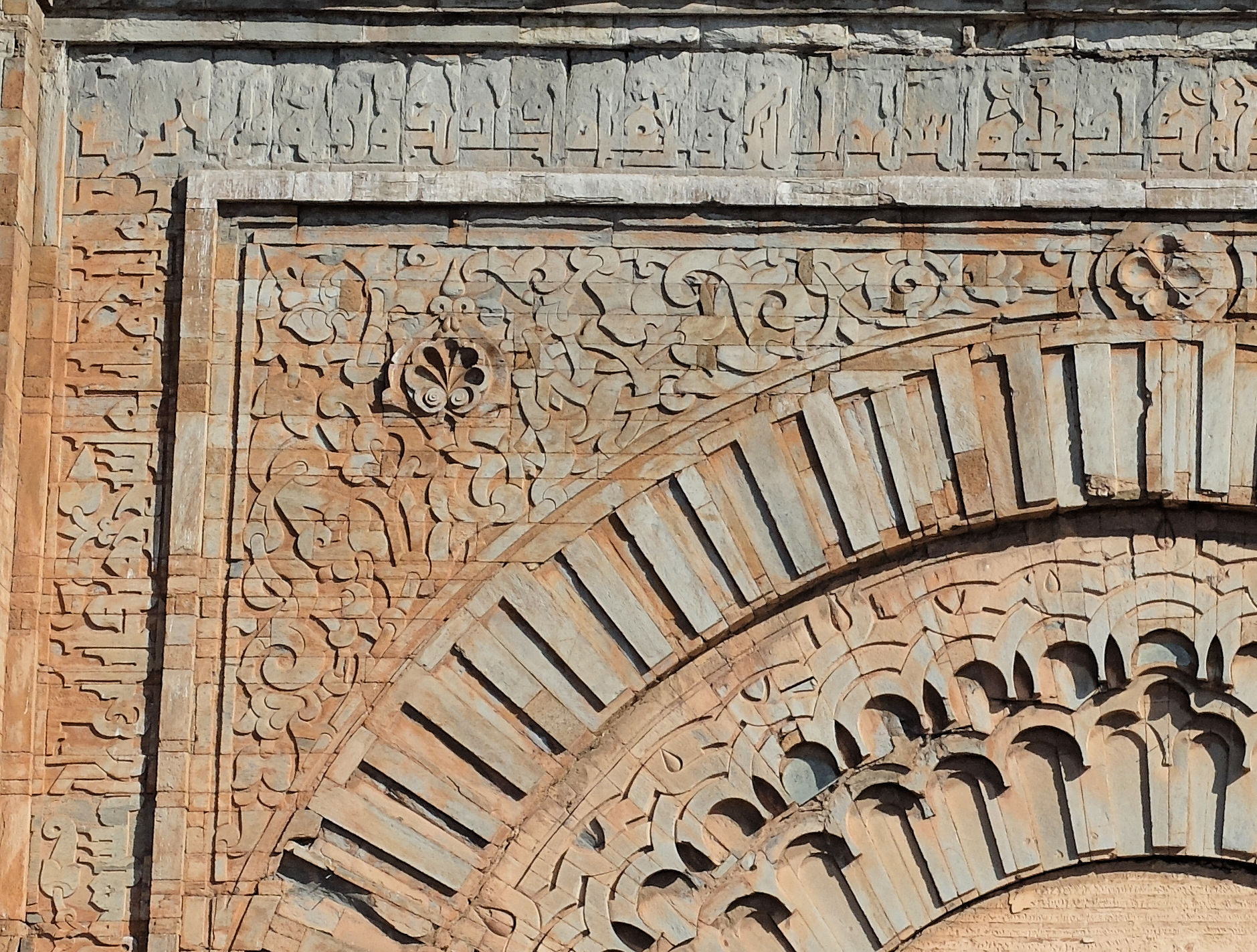
The carved decoration of the facade, including the floral motifs and the Kufic Arabic inscription

It is located just inside the walls of the main city (medina), near Bab er-Robb, at the northwestern corner of the Kasbah. The function of the gate was primarily decorative, given its location already inside the city walls. The gate was nonetheless originally flanked by two bastion towers crowned with merlons and the passage inside was a bent entrance (meaning it turned 90 degrees before exiting) passing through a large vaulted vestibule. On top of the gate was a terrace reached by an interior staircase. This original layout made it similar to other monumental Almohad gates such as Bab er-Rouah in Rabat. The flanking towers and the covered vestibule, however, have since disappeared, and the archway of the gate has been partly filled-in with a smaller and simpler brick arch. The reduction of the archway likely dates from the time of the Alaouite sultan Sidi Muhammad ibn Abdallah, who carried out numerous works in the area of the Kasbah. The current small open courtyard behind the gate is the result of later work.

Nonetheless, the gate has preserved its rich stone-carved decoration from the Almohad period, again comparable to that of Bab er-Rouah and of Bab Oudaia in Rabat. The façade consists of sandstone, likely quarried in the Gueliz area near Marrakesh. The original arch of the gate is surrounded by alternating semi-circular bands that alternate between radiating lines and interlacing arch motifs. The spandrels (corner areas) are covered in floral motifs (arabesques), each with a carved shell in the middle. All of this ornamentation is in turn framed by a long frieze carved with an inscription from the Quran in foliated Kufic letters. The inscription includes excerpts from the Surah al-Hijr. On either side of the decorated facade are pilasters which are sometimes thought to have supported a canopy or awning but which is believed by many scholars to have been merely a decorative transition between the decorated facade and the flanking bastions of the gate.

== State of conservation ==
The stone materials of the gate has suffered over time. Some of the upper stone decoration has deteriorated. The causes of the decay have been attributed to the presence of soluble salts, particularly chlorides and sulfates, present in the mortar used to fix the stones. Local air pollution is also having a negative effect on the state of the gate.

== See also ==
- Bab Ksiba
- Giralda
- Hassan Tower
- Koutoubia Mosque
- Menara gardens
