= Bab Ksiba =

Coordinates: 31.6122°N 7.9893°W

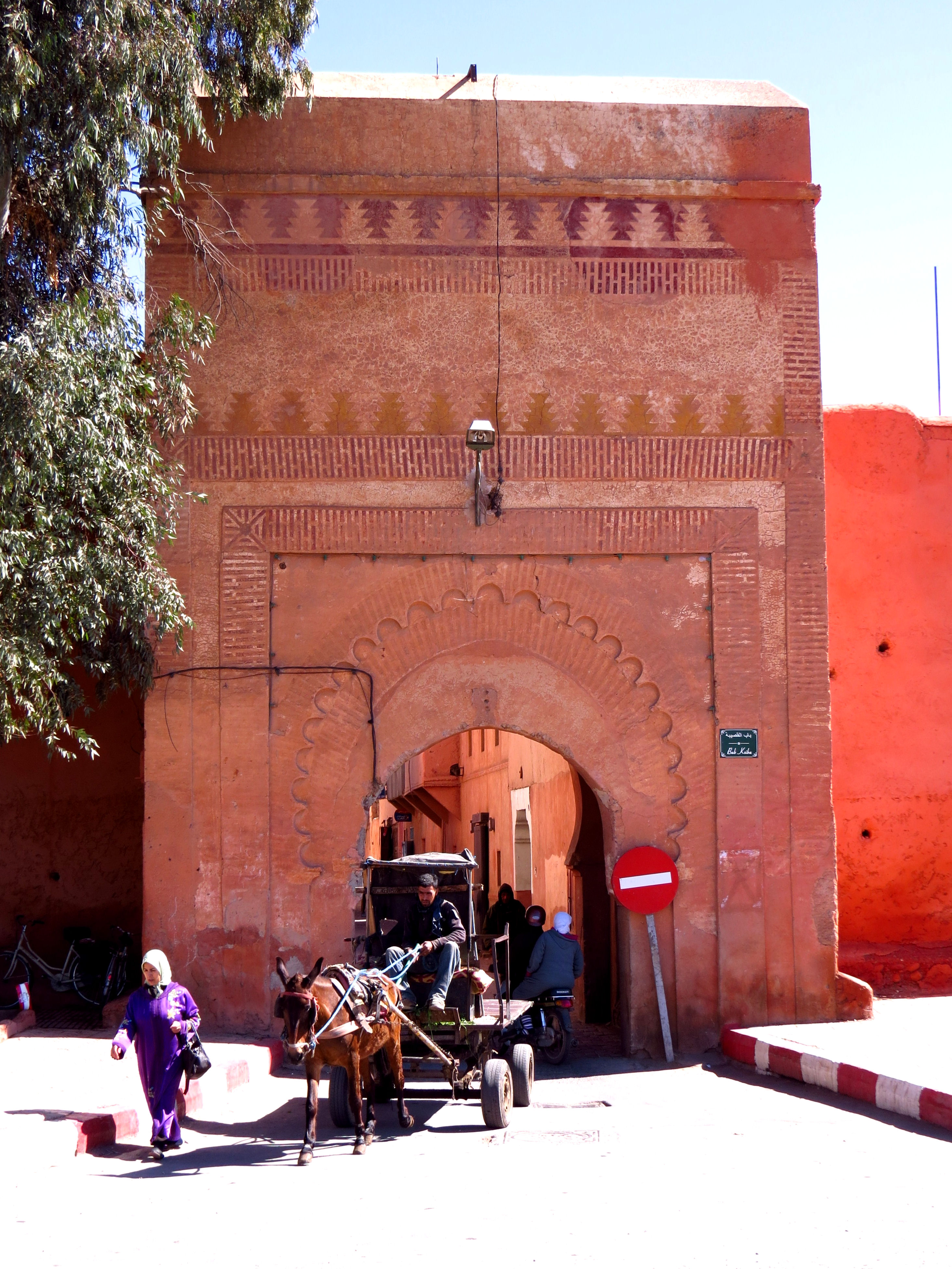
Bab Ksiba

Bab Ksiba (Arabic: باب القصيبة, Bāb al-Quṣayyabah) is a gate in Marrakesh, Morocco. Bab Ksiba and another more famous gate further north, Bab Agnaou, served as entrances to the Kasbah (citadel) district in the southern part of the medina of Marrakesh, a UNESCO World Heritage Site.

== Historical background ==
The name Ksiba, (pronounced Lak- siba), in Berber refers to the Kasbah district of the Medina, where this gateway is located. Kasbah means "fortress" and ksiba (or qusayba) means literally "Little-Fort".

The Kasbah of Marrakesh, built by the Almohad sultan Yaqub al-Mansur, is the site of the Kasbah Mosque, the El Badi Palace and the Saadian Tombs. Bab Ksiba was the entrance to another small kasbah (ksiba or qusayba) which was adjoined to the southwestern corner of the main kasbah in order to protect the western side of the Grand Mechouar (a vast open square, still present today, at the entrance of the royal palace) and the Derb Chtouka neighbourhood. The date of its construction is unclear; it existed at the beginning of the 19th century and may have been built under Muhammad ibn Abdallah in the 18th century, but was almost certainly not part of the original Almohad kasbah.

== See also ==
- Walls of Marrakesh
