= Bab er-Rouah =

Gate in Rabat, Morocco

Coordinates: 34°0′46.1″N 6°50′15.5″W

- باب الرواح
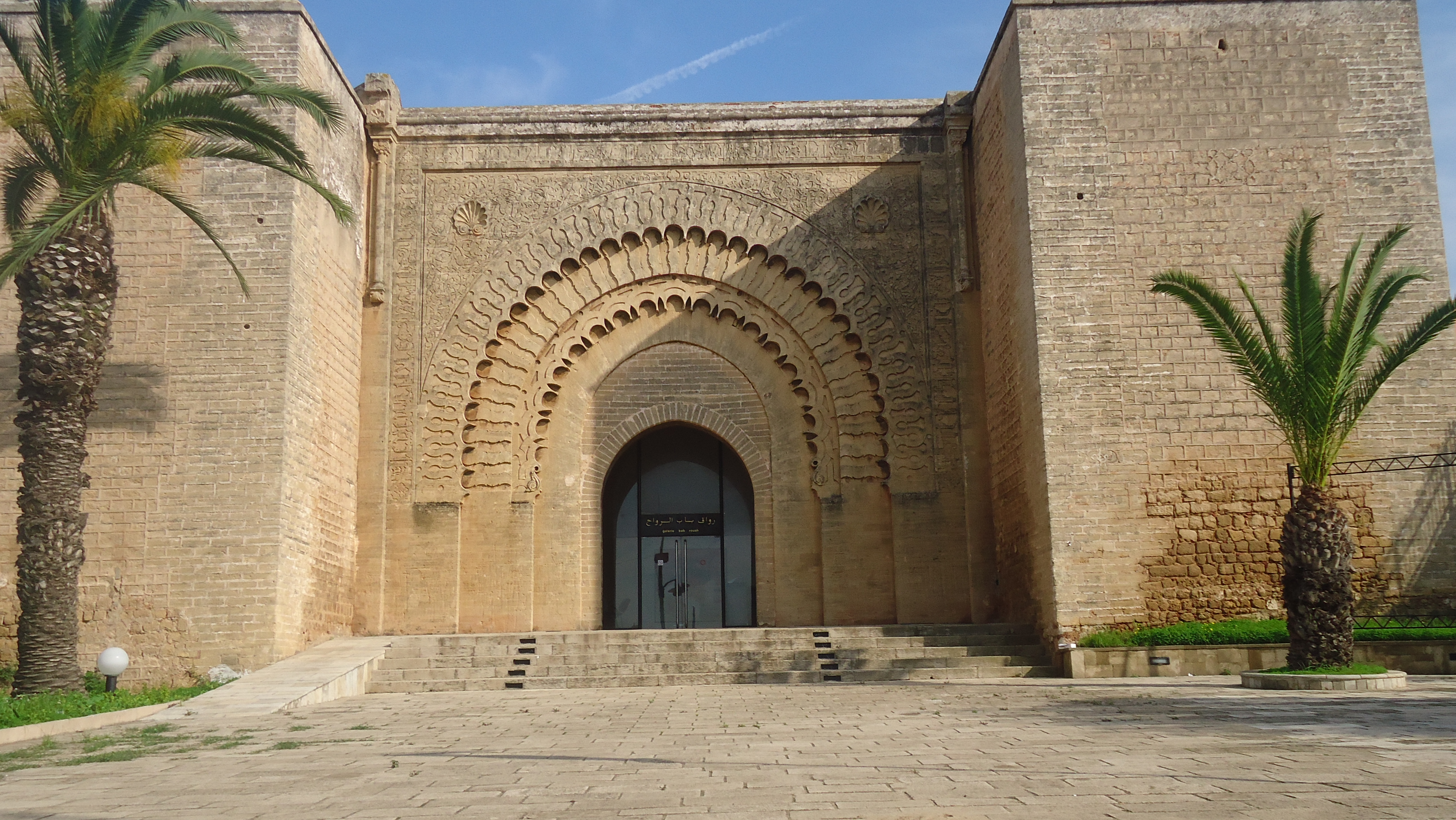
- The outer façade of the gate
- Interactive map of the Bab er-Rouah area

General information
- Type: City Gate
- Architectural style: Almohad, Moroccan
- Location: Rabat

Bab er-Rouah (Arabic: باب الرواح, romanized: Bāb al-Ruwāḥ, lit. 'Gate of the Winds'; also spelled Bab er-Ruwah or Bab Rouah) is a monumental gate in the Almohad-era ramparts of Rabat, Morocco.

== History ==
It was built by the Almohad caliph Ya'qub al-Mansur in the late 12th century, as part of the monumental capital he started building here. The gate and its adjoining ramparts were finished by 1197. The Arabic name Bab ar-Ruwah, meaning "Gate of the Winds", likely derives from the strong Atlantic winds which batter the city.

The entrance archway of the gate today is smaller than it was originally because it has been partly filled-in with smaller stones. This reduction dates from the time of the Alaouite sultan Sidi Muhammad ibn Abdallah (second half of 18th century), who made similar adjustments to the Bab Agnaou gate in Marrakesh.

Today the gate's interior has been converted into an art gallery. It was recently renovated in 2000–2001.

== Architecture ==
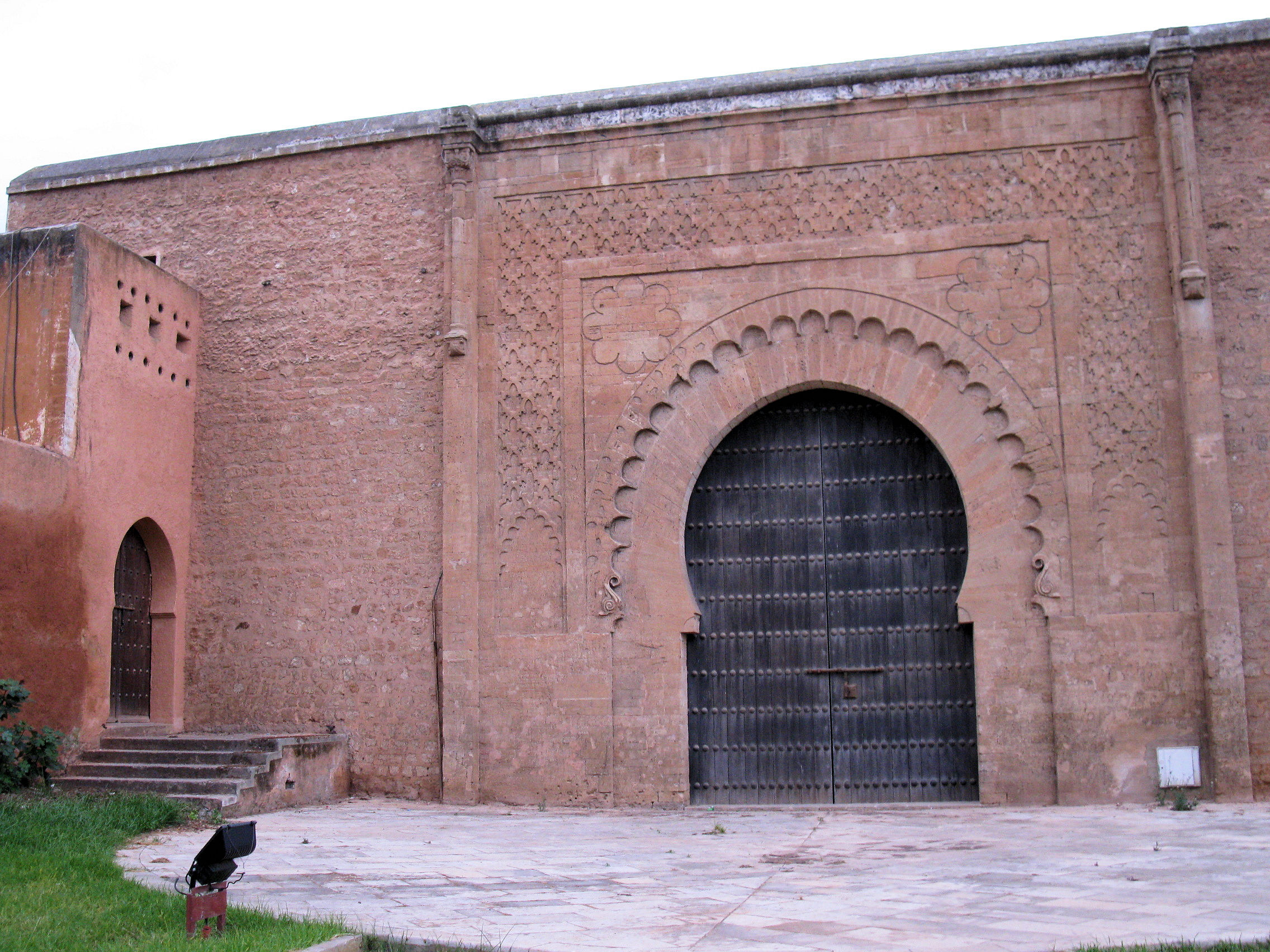
The inner façade of the gate

The gate is notable for its defensive structure as well as for its rich stone-carved decoration which is comparable to other monumental Almohad gates such as Bab Oudaia to the north (also in Rabat) and to Bab Agnaou in Marrakesh. The gate was built in reddish stone but the constant blow of the seaborne winds has changed much of its colour to a duller grey. The gate's exterior entrance is flanked by two bastion towers. The archway of the entrance was partially filled-in with a smaller arch under the Alaouite sultan Muhammad ibn Abdallah in the second half of the 18th century.

The decoration of the gate's outer façade includes three concentric semi-circles carved with polylobed and radiating motifs, which are in turn framed inside a rectangular alfiz. The two ends of the innermost semi-circle, at the spring of the arch, are carved into "S"-like serpentine forms which are also seen at Bab Oudaia but very rarely elsewhere. The spandrels between in the corners within this alfiz are carved with arabesque vegetal motifs in at the center of which is a carved seashell. The frame of the alfiz itself contains an Arabic inscription in Kufic script featuring a Qur'anic verse, translated as the following:

Be a community that calls for what is good, urges what is right, and forbids what is wrong: those who do this are the successful ones. Do not be like those who, after they have been given clear revelation, split into factions and fall into disputes: a terrible punishment awaits such people.

— Qur'an, 3:104-5

The gate's interior passage passes through four chambers and turns 90 degrees four times, constituting a complex bent entrance typical of Almohad military architecture. One of the chambers was originally open from above (but is sheltered by a roof today) so that the defenders could throw projectiles onto any attackers entering the gate. The inner façade of the gate, facing towards the city, is more simply decorated with a single polylobed semi-circle carved around the horseshoe archway, which is framed by a wide band filled with a sebka pattern.
