= List of mosques in Africa =

This is a partial list of mosques in Africa.

== List of mosques by African country ==
=== Botswana ===
Name	Image	Location	Year (CE)	Group	Notes
Lobatse Mosque		Gaborone	1967		
Masjid Jamia		Gaborone			
Masjid-Un-Noor		Gaborone			
Shah Khalid Mosque		Gaborone			

=== Burkina Faso ===
Name	Image	Location	Year (CE)	Group	Notes
Grand Mosque of Bobo-Dioulasso		Bobo-Dioulasso	1832		

=== Chad ===
Name	Image	Location	Year (CE)	Group	Notes
N'Djamena Grand Mosque		N'Djamena	1978	Su	

=== Equatorial Guinea ===
Name	Image	Location	Year (CE)	Group	Notes
Malabo Mosque		Malabo, Bioko Norte	2015	Su	

=== Eritrea ===
Name	Image	Location	Year (CE)	Group	Notes
Masjid as-Sahabah		Massawa	613		Believed by some to be the first mosque on the African continent and the first mosque in the world built by the companions of Muhammad in the 7th century.
Great Mosque of Asmara		Asmara	1938		The minaret resembles a fluted Roman column

=== Eswatini ===
Name	Image	Location	Year (CE)	Group	Notes
Ezulwini Mosque		Lobamba	1978	Su	

=== Ethiopia ===
Name	Image	Location	Year (CE)	Group	Notes
Al Nejashi Mosque		Negash	7th century		Founded in the 7th century in Negash, by tradition the burial site of several followers of the Islamic Prophet Muhammad who, during his lifetime, fled to the Aksumite Kingdom to escape persecution in Mecca. It was recently renovated by TIKA, a Turkish cooperation organization.

=== The Gambia ===
Name	Image	Location	Year (CE)	Group	Notes
Pipeline Mosque		Serekunda	1990		

=== Mauritius ===
Name	Image	Location	Year (CE)	Group	Notes
Jummah Mosque		Port Louis	1852		Completed in the Moorish and Mughal styles.

=== Mayotte ===
Name	Image	Location	Year (CE)	Group	Notes
Tsingoni Mosque		Tsingoni, Overseas France	1538		Considered the earliest mosque in France.

=== Namibia ===
Name	Image	Location	Year (CE)	Group	Notes
Windhoek Islamic Center		Windhoek, Khomas Region	1986		

=== Réunion ===
Name	Image	Location	Year (CE)	Group	Notes
Noor-e-Islam Mosque		Saint-Denis	1905		

=== Sudan ===
Name	Image	Location	Year (CE)	Group	Notes
Throne Hall of Dongola		Old Dongola	1317		Built in the 9th century; converted to a mosque in 1317; abandoned during the 19th century; ceased to be a mosque in 1969; preserved as a monument.
Al-Nilin Mosque		Khartoum	1984	Su	

=== Uganda ===
Name	Image	Location	Year (CE)	Group	Notes
Kibuli Mosque		Kibuli, Kampala	1951		A national cultural site
Aga Khan Mosque		Old Kampala, Kampala	1978	Sh	A national cultural site
Uganda National Mosque		Old Kampala, Kampala	2006	Su	Opened as the Gaddafi National Mosque and renamed in 2013. It is the largest mosque in East Africa, with capacity for c. 20,000 worshippers.

== Legend ==
Group / Tradition	Abbreviation
Ahmadiyya	A
Non-denominational	ND
Shia Islam	SH
Sunni Islam	Su

== See also ==
- Islam in Africa
- Lists of mosques
