= Aga Khan Mosque =

Mosque in Kampala, Uganda

- Ismaili Jamatkhana
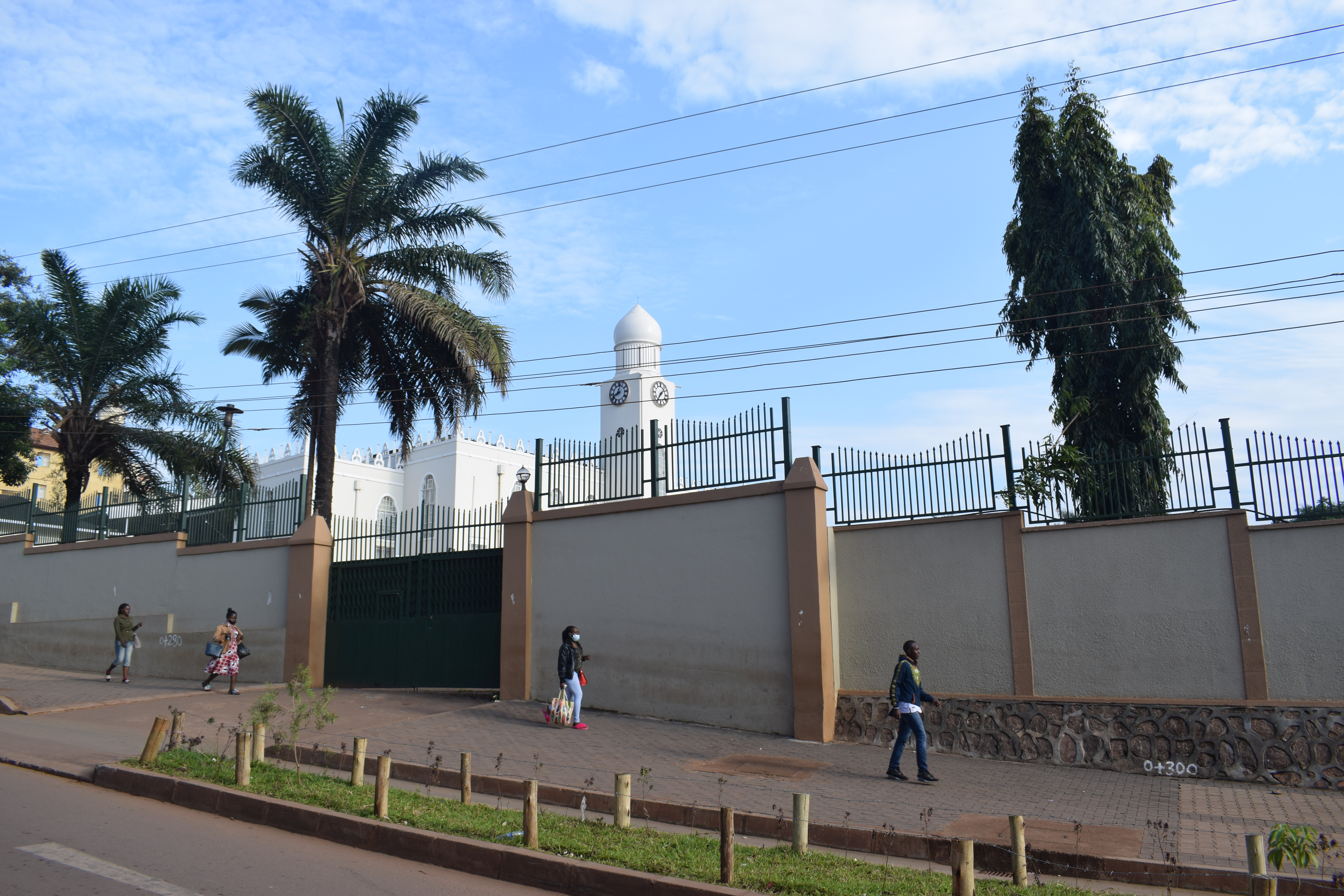

- Location of the mosque in Uganda

Religion
- Affiliation: Shia Islam
- Ecclesiastical or organisational status: Mosque
- Status: Active

Location
- Location: Old Kampala, Kampala
- Country: Uganda
- Interactive map of Aga Khan Mosque
- Coordinates: 0°19′0″N 32°34′46″E

Architecture
- Architect: Abdel Wahed El-Wakil
- Type: Mosque
- Founder: Aga Khan IV
- Completed: 1978

Specifications
- Dome: 1
- Minaret: 4

The Aga Khan Mosque (Luganda: Ismaili Jamatkhana), also known as the Old Kampala Mosque, is a Shia mosque located in the historic Old Kampala district of Kampala, in Uganda. The mosque serves as an essential place of worship for the Muslim community in Uganda.

The mosque was listed as a National Cultural Site of Uganda.

== History ==
The Aga Khan Mosque traces its origins to the generous contribution of the Aga Khan IV, the spiritual leader of the Shia Ismaili Muslim community. The mosque's construction was initiated in the late 1970s and completed in the early 1980s. It was officially inaugurated on October 8, 1978.

== Architecture ==
The mosque was designed by an Egyptian architect Abdel Wahed El-Wakil, known for his innovative blend of modern and traditional Islamic architectural styles. The Aga Khan Mosque showcases exquisite craftsmanship and attention to detail, reflecting the Islamic architectural traditions, with intricate calligraphy and geometric patterns adorning its interior and exterior.

The architectural design of the Aga Khan Mosque is a fusion of Islamic architectural elements with a contemporary twist. The mosque features a large central dome and is complemented by four minarets, each topped with a crescent moon. It is surrounded by a landscaped sahn, adorned with gardens and fountains. Inside the mosque, there is a spacious prayer hall with decorative elements, including intricate mosaic tilework and chandeliers. The prayer hall can accommodate a large number of worshippers, making it a central gathering place for the local Muslim community.

As a place of worship, the mosque plays a crucial role in the spiritual life of the Shia Ismaili Muslim community in Uganda. It provides a space for daily prayers, religious gatherings, and celebrations of Islamic festivals. The mosque's architectural design and history have made it a cultural landmark in Kampala. It attracts visitors from diverse backgrounds who come to admire its beauty and learn about Islamic culture and history. The mosque has also been a venue for interfaith dialogue and community outreach programs.

== See also ==
- Islam in Uganda
- List of mosques in Africa
- List of national cultural sites in Central Region
