= N'Djamena Grand Mosque =

Mosque in N'Djamena, Chad

- Grande Mosquée de N'Djamena
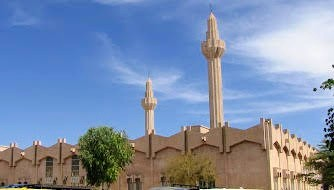

- Location of the mosque in Chad

Religion
- Affiliation: Sunni Islam
- Ecclesiastical or organizational status: Mosque
- Status: Active

Location
- Location: N'Djamena
- Country: Chad
- Interactive map of N'Djamena Grand Mosque
- Coordinates: 12°06′38″N 15°03′03″E

Architecture
- Type: mosque
- Completed: 1978
- Minaret: 2

The N'Djamena Grand Mosque (French: Grande Mosquée de N'Djamena) is a mosque in N'Djamena, Chad.

== Overview ==
The mosque was established in 1978 and the complex consists of libraries, lecture halls and schools.

== See also ==
- Islam in Chad
- List of mosques in Africa
