= Dar Moulay Ali =

Historic building in Marrakesh, Morocco

Coordinates: 31°37′25.9″N 7°59′33.5″W

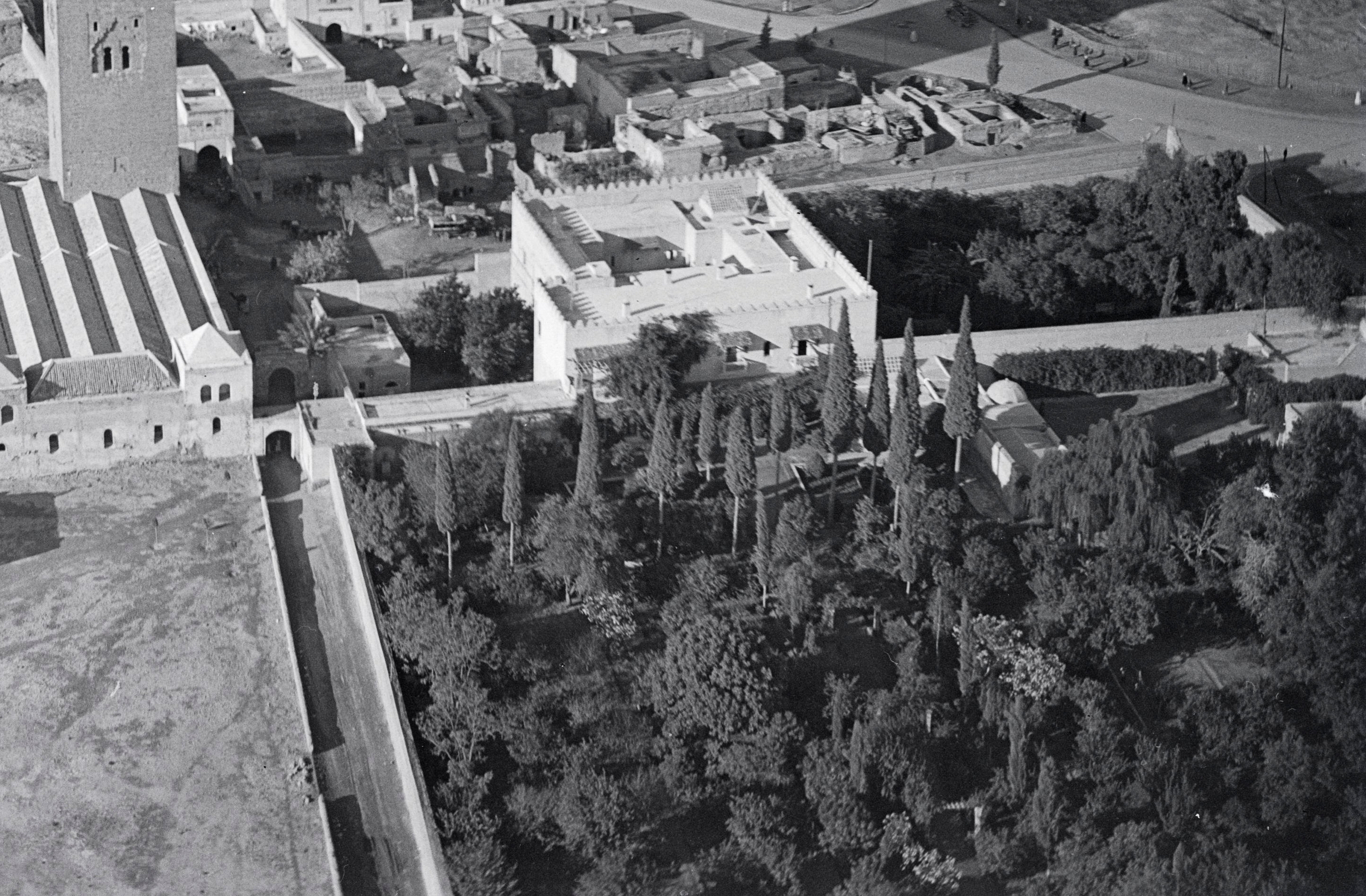
Dar Moulay Ali, seen in an aerial photograph in 1930–31, near the Kutubiyya Mosque (partly visible in the upper left). The main residence (upper middle) is visible, as is the former riad garden (upper right) which formed its main entrance on its east side. A larger garden was located on its south side (middle and lower right).

Dar Moulay Ali is a historic residence and riad in Marrakesh, Morocco. It is located right next to the Kutubiyya Mosque. It currently houses the French consulate.

== History ==
The residence was built in the 1820s, during the reign of Sultan Moulay Abd ar-Rahman, by Sulayman as-Siyadmi, a qaid of the Chiadma tribe. Moulay Abd ar-Rahman's son and successor, Muhammad IV, confiscated the residence and gifted it to his brother Ali (Moulay Ali), after whom the residence is now named. During the French Protectorate in Morocco (1912-1956), it was used as the residence of various military officials. Today it remains in use as the official office and residence of the French consulate. The building was most recently restored in 2015.

== Architecture ==
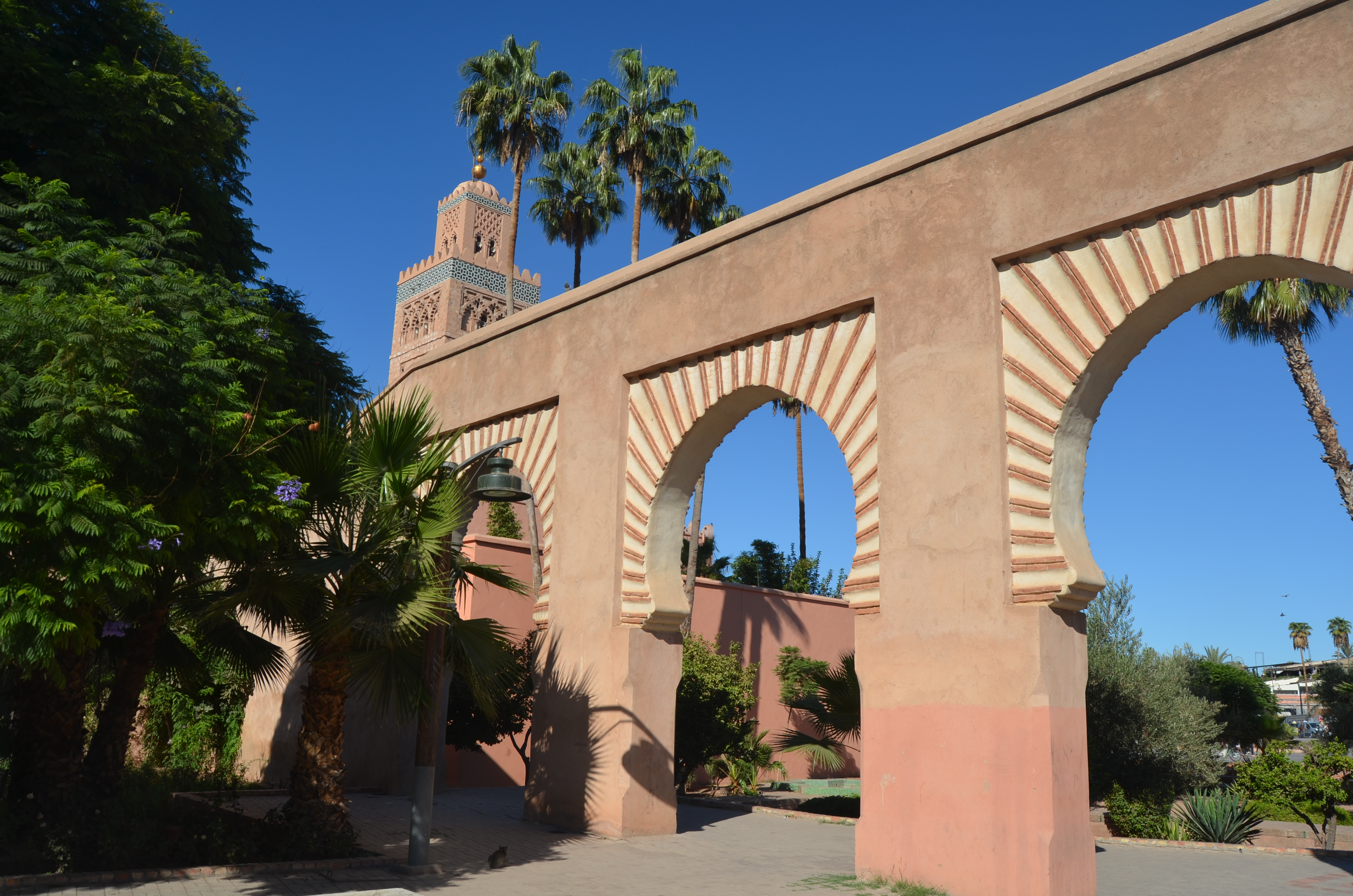
Arches and garden outside the Dar Moulay Ali today, formerly part of the palace's outer (eastern) garden

The residence is located directly east of the Kutubiyya Mosque, between the mosque and the main road today. It consists of a large house centered around a small courtyard garden, off which ornate salons opened. The house was decorated with painted arabesque motifs, zellij tilework, and epigraphic Arabic inscriptions. An imposing menzeh or viewing pavilion originally stood on its southwestern side, next to the mosque, but this was demolished in the 1920s. The residence's original main entrance was on its northeast side, where a large rectangular riad garden (a garden divided into four parts by two crossing paths, with a central fountain at the intersection of the paths) led up to a decorated porch in front of the entrance doorway. The riad garden had two small outer entrances on its east side but the main entrance to the compound was through another courtyard on its south side. This courtyard and the riad garden, however, were mostly demolished in the 20th century when the main road on its east side was enlarged, although traces of it have been preserved and can be seen outside the present-day walls of the residence. An even larger garden park was stretched out on the south side of the residence and still exists today.

== See also ==
- French Protectorate Residence, Rabat
