= List of national cultural sites in Central Region, Uganda =

This article contains a list of national cultural sites in Uganda in the Central Region of Uganda as defined by the Uganda Museum.

ID	Site name	Description	District	Location	Original function	Coordinates	Image
UG-C-001	Speke Memorial Monument	Spot where explorer John Speke stood and sighted the source of the river Nile in 1862	Buikwe				Upload another image
UG-C-002	Mabira Forest	Cultural resource, with indigenous, herbal medicinal trees	Mukono				More images Upload another image
UG-C-003	?		Bukomansimbi				Upload an image
UG-C-004	?		Butambala				Upload an image
UG-C-005	Buvuma Island	Sangoan Later Stone Age site with earthworks and rock art paintings	Buvuma				Upload another image
UG-C-006	?		Gomba				Upload an image
UG-C-007	Ssese Islands	The islands are rich in Middle Stone Age artefacts (flakes, tortoise cores and rough picks), late Stone Age artefacts (waste, flakes chips and small cores), and Iron Age materials (from the earthworks)	Kalangala				More images Upload another image
UG-C-008	Luggo Forest	Site where the Ddamula, or scepter for Buganda Kingdom's king, was obtained					Upload an image
UG-C-009	?		Kalungu				Upload an image
UG-C-010	Independence Monument	Statue commemorating the 1962 Independence Monument, representing an adult lifting a newborn (Uganda)	Kampala				More images Upload another image
UG-C-011	Independence Tablet	Commonwealth independence – 9 October 1962 – Jubilee Park	Kampala				Upload another image
UG-C-012	Kololo Monument	Monument commemorating 50 years of independence	Kampala				Upload an image
UG-C-013	Kololo Hero Monument	Ignatius Musaazi, independence liberation hero	Kampala				More images Upload another image
UG-C-014	Kololo Ceremonial Grounds	Commemoration of Uganda's independence on 9 October 1962. It was last redeveloped on 9 May 2012.	Kampala				More images Upload another image
UG-C-015	Mackay Memorial, Nateete	Anglican Church at the site of the first Church Mission Society settlement (1890), headed by Reverend Alexander Murdoch Mackay	Kampala				More images Upload another image
UG-C-016	Busega Martyrs Memorial	Rubaga, where three Anglican martyrs were killed and buried	Kampala				More images Upload another image
UG-C-017	Bulange	Royal seat of the Buganda Kingdom	Kampala				More images Upload another image
UG-C-018	Nagalabi Buddo	Coronation site for Buganda Kings	Kampala				Upload an image
UG-C-019	All Saints Church Kisozi	One of the oldest churches in Uganda	Kampala				Upload an image
UG-C-020	Shree Shanathan Dharma	1954 Hindu temple, in its original form, with rich oriental architecture and a model for traditional building	Kampala				More images Upload another image
UG-C-021	Lubaga Cathedral	Seat of the Catholic church in Uganda	Kampala				More images Upload another image
UG-C-022	Nabulagala Mapeera church	Seat of the Anglican church in Uganda, a historic cave and historic buildings built by missionaries. The first cathedral was built in 1890–1894 of mud and wattle	Kampala				More images Upload another image
UG-C-023	Gadaffi Mosque	The main seat of the Chief Khadi of Ugandan Muslims	Kampala				More images Upload another image
UG-C-024	Kibuli Mosque	Seat of the Muslim faith built in 1945 by the Agha Khan and Prince of Buganda	Kampala				More images Upload another image
UG-C-025	Kampala Baháʼí Temple	Seat for the Baháʼí Faith in Uganda	Kampala				More images Upload another image
UG-C-026	Lusaze Lubya Church	Catholic mission of 1879 Kijukizo church	Kampala				More images Upload another image
UG-C-027	Fort Lugard, Old Kampala	Established by Captain Frederick Lugard in 1890, served as headquarters until 1894 and survived as the first museum in the country and the Gaddafi mosque	Kampala				More images Upload another image
UG-C-028	Aga Khan Mosque	Old Kampala	Kampala	Martin Road			Upload another image
UG-C-029	St Athanasius Bazzekuketta	Mengo Memorial, Catholic martyr	Kampala				Upload an image
UG-C-030	St Matiya Mulumba	Site in memory of the first of the 22 Catholic martyrs	Kampala				Upload another image
UG-C-031	High Court building Nakasero	Seat of the highest court in Uganda	Kampala				Upload another image
UG-C-032	Parliamentary building	Meeting place of Ugandan lawmakers	Kampala				More images Upload another image
UG-C-033	Uganda Bookshop	Oldest bookshop, established in 1927 as a publishing and printing house	Kampala	4 Colville Street			More images Upload another image
UG-C-034	Makerere University Building	Ivory Tower building, one of the oldest iconic education institutions	Kampala				More images Upload another image
UG-C-035	Basiima Bakyagaya house	Kagwa's house of the late Sir Apollo, built in 1903. Located on Kabaka Njagala Road	Kampala				More images Upload another image
UG-C-036	Buganda court building	Mengo	Kampala				More images Upload another image
UG-C-037	Doset building		Kampala	Makerere University			Upload another image
UG-C-038	Naguru communications mast	Uganda's national television and radio	Kampala				More images Upload another image
UG-C-039	Uganda Museum	Oldest museum in East Africa	Kampala				More images Upload another image
UG-C-040	National Theatre	National culture centre	Kampala				More images Upload another image
UG-C-041	Public Library	On Buganda House Road, in an Indian building	Kampala				More images Upload another image
UG-C-042	Nommo Gallery	African village	Kampala				Upload another image
UG-C-043	Tulifanya Gallery	Art gallery and craft shop	Kampala				More images Upload another image
UG-C-044	St. Balikudembe (Owino) Market	Traditional market in centre of city	Kampala				More images Upload another image
UG-C-045	Nakasero Market	Built in 1927	Kampala				More images Upload another image
UG-C-046	Mulago hospital	National Referral Hospital, Old Mulago, founded in 1913 by Sir Albert Ruskin Cook, while the New Mulago facility was completed in 1962	Kampala				More images Upload another image
UG-C-047	Musa body metal works	Katwe plant for oil refining and brick making	Kampala				Upload another image
UG-C-048	Twekobe Palace	Kabaka Mutesa II residential palace	Kampala				More images Upload another image
UG-C-049	Butikkiro	Official residence of Katikkiro of Buganda	Kampala				Upload an image
UG-C-050	Kabaka lake	Manmade lake	Kampala				More images Upload another image
UG-C-051	Kampala Club	Oldest club in Kampala	Kampala	Sezzibwa Road			Upload another image
UG-C-052	Kisingiris House	historic building of the Kabaka's chiefs	Kampala				Upload another image
UG-C-053	Tefio Kisonsokole	The first church built by Tefiro Kisosonkole on the spot where the Uganda martyrs were buried. Kisosonkole was a Buganda prime minister.					More images Upload another image
UG-C-054	Sir Albert Cook's House	Makindye, Kabaka's birthplace	Kampala				Upload another image
UG-C-055	Kawuta's House		Kampala	Ring Road			Upload an image
UG-C-056	CHOGM Monument	Impressive copper structure commemorating the hosting of the meeting of the heads of government in Uganda in 2007.	Kampala				More images Upload another image
UG-C-057	Clock Tower	Commemorates the Queen's visit in 1954	Kampala	Queen's Way			More images Upload another image
UG-C-058	Kololo Airstrip	Monuments, burial for heroes, airstrip national functions	Kampala				Upload an image
UG-C-059	Constitutional Square	Upper part commemorates World war II victims. Lower part is the monument of the constitutional square	Kampala				More images Upload another image
UG-C-060	Kasubi Tombs	Grass thatched round house containing the tombs and insignia of Mutesa I, and three northern subsequent rulers of Buganda	Kampala				More images Upload another image
UG-C-061	Kasubi Masgid Tawahud Mosque	Built by Mutesa I in 1870 when he first had his capital at Kasubi, Nabulagala	Kampala				More images Upload another image
UG-C-062	Wamala Tombs	Grass thatched round hut very similar to Kasubi tombs, containing the tombs of Sunna II of the Buganda kingdom 1856	Kampala				More images Upload another image
UG-C-063	Mapeera Bakateyamba House Nalukolongo	Established by Mapeera to treat the disabled and the elderly	Kampala				Upload another image
UG-C-064	Kiwewas Tombs	Tombs of King Kiwewa	Kampala	Masanafu			More images Upload another image
UG-C-065	Old railway house	Railways building –More information	Kampala				More images Upload another image
UG-C-066	GOU analytical lab	Built in 192, a historical building	Kampala				Upload another image
UG-C-067	Corner House	historic buildings	Kampala	Plot 44 Rashid Hamis road			More images Upload another image
UG-C-068	St Peter's Boys Nsambya	One of the first schools of the Hill Mill Fathers 1907	Kampala				More images Upload another image
UG-C-069	Nsambya convent	Several historic buildings	Kampala				Upload an image
UG-C-070	Musajalumbwa house		Kampala				Upload an image
UG-C-071	Kisingiris House Mengo	Residential	Kampala				Upload an image
UG-C-072	Kakungulu's house		Kampala				Upload an image
UG-C-073	Gomboloa House	Balintuma road	Kampala				Upload an image
UG-C-074	Speke Hotel	Built in 1920, historical and has maintained colonial look	Kampala				Upload another image
UG-C-075	Port Bell Pier	1st- pier for large ships landing in Luzira	Kampala				More images Upload another image
UG-C-076	Granda Imperial Hotel	One of the oldest hotels in Kampala, initially known as Grand Hotel	Kampala				More images Upload another image
UG-C-077	Ruparellia Building	Martin Road	Kampala				Upload another image
UG-C-078	Mawandas House	Salaama Road	Kampala				Upload an image
UG-C-079	Kampala Club	Ssezibwa Road	Kampala				Upload another image
UG-C-080	Jimmy Purmas House	Salaama road	Kampala				Upload an image
UG-C-081	Centenary Park		Kampala				Upload an image
UG-C-082	Kalagala Falls	Falls with a series of natural and cultural caves	Kayunga				Upload an image
UG-C-083	Bukomero	Mass graves, NRA War memorial	Kiboga				Upload an image
UG-C-084	Lwamata	Mass graves and NRA war memorial					Upload an image
UG-C-085	Mpanga Forest	Several shrines and 16 springs are found here					Upload another image
UG-C-086	?		Kyankwanzi				Upload an image
UG-C-087	Butuntumula Kikyusa, Zirobwe Makulubita	NRA War mass graves memorial	Luweero				Upload an image
UG-C-088	Walusii Hills	At Kikyusa is Muteesa' palace and main ancestral grounds					Upload an image
UG-C-089	Mulajje Cathedral Kasana	The 3rd catholic cathedral/seminary in the country was established in 1914by the white fathers after Daudi Chwa gave them 30 acres of land					Upload an image
UG-C-090	?		Lwengo				Upload an image
UG-C-091	?		Lyantonde				Upload an image
UG-C-092	Masaka Fort	Fort established and existed from 1897 to 1901, and originally the site of a church	Masaka				Upload an image
UG-C-093	?	Missionary Society (CMS) station					Upload an image
UG-C-094	Villa Maria Building	First Catholic old mission church and brick house 1891					More images Upload another image
UG-C-095	Kitovu Catholic Cathedral	Catholic church on the World Monuments Watch list					More images Upload another image
UG-C-096	Father Ngobya Memorial	Burial place for renowned Father Aloysius Ngobya at Kitovu Catholic church					Upload another image
UG-C-097	Kiwala Pit shafts	At Kako, are Kaolin pit shafts similar to those of Mityana for mining					Upload an image
UG-C-098	Tanda archaeological site	Old mining pit shafts (Kaolin) (Enyanga za Walumbe), totaling 400 in number	Mityana				Upload an image
UG-C-099	Kyamusisi	NRA War memorial, and mass burial grounds					Upload an image
UG-C-100	Magonga Shrines	2 miles to Mudende Town are Kintus shrines					Upload an image
UG-C-101	Bukalamuli Catholic Mission	NRA war memorial, Kikandwa Lutta memorial, and diocese					Upload an image
UG-C-102	?						Upload an image
UG-C-103	Equator Monument	At Kayabwe circular arches on both sides of the road signify the equator crossing	Mpigi				More images Upload another image
UG-C-104	Kibibi	NRA War mass grave					Upload an image
UG-C-105	Muduuma	NRA War mass grave					Upload an image
UG-C-106	Kiringa ente	NRA War mass grave at Luvumbula					Upload an image
UG-C-107	Kiringa ente Buto Buvuma	At Luvumbula again is a ritual site and place for the coronation of Saaza chiefs					Upload an image
UG-C-108	Mubende Hill (witch tree)	Last Chwezi Capital	Mubende				Upload an image
UG-C-109	Kanyogoga gorge	Corridor					Upload an image
UG-C-110	Lake Wamala	Receded from Lake Victoria, with active shrines of King Wamala					Upload another image
UG-C-111	Moniko Rock Engravings	Engravings and harrows on top of the hill	Mukono				Upload an image
UG-C-112	Kitale Rock Gong	Popularly known as Dindo's Rock with Kintus foot, print, etc					Upload another image
UG-C-113	Polish Refugee camp	Kojja (Mpunge) Polish Jewish refugees were exiled in Uganda in 1945					Upload an image
UG-C-114	Kisweera	NRA War Memorial					Upload an image
UG-C-115	Kinanisi	Royal iron working and smelting site					Upload an image
UG-C-116	Ssezibwa Falls	Cultural site and forest resource with spiritual significance					More images Upload another image
UG-C-117	Ma Ngira forest	Traditional cultural forest resource					Upload an image
UG-C-118	Buvuma Islands	Rock paintings and cultural forests in Mpaata					Upload an image
UG-C-119	Ham Mukasa Home	Gulu, Nasuti Ham Mukasaa country residence					Upload an image
UG-C-120	Nambis cave shrine	In Kyagwe Hwere, the Kinti Nimbi and Walumbe are still worshiped, and soldiers, business, fraternity, and job seekers flock to the place for blessings					Upload an image
UG-C-121	Katikamu war memorial	Mass graves	Nakaseke				Upload an image
UG-C-122	Wakyato	Mass grave and memorial at the Sub county headquarters					Upload an image
UG-C-123	Kikamulo	Mass grave and memorial at Sub county headquarters					Upload an image
UG-C-124	Nakaseke	Mass grave and Memorial					Upload an image
UG-C-125	Semutto	Mass grave and Memorial					Upload an image
UG-C-126	Namunkekeera Kappeka	Mass grave and memorial					Upload an image
UG-C-127	Nakibinge Tombs	At Kitinda are shrines for Kabaka Nakibinge					Upload an image
UG-C-128	Bumera Tombs	Kanzinze Masuulita are shrines Kimeras					Upload an image
UG-C-129	Luwoko Katikamu Masulita	Kabaka Tembo's palace					Upload an image
UG-C-130	Oyite Ojok Memorial site	At Mijeera, plane crash site	Nakasongola				Upload an image
UG-C-131	Nakasongola Hill	Nakasongola named after a stone on Nakasongola hill that sticks out					Upload an image
UG-C-132	Kageri Hill, Wabinyoyi	Historically known by the Baruli for Protection against their enemies					More images Upload another image
UG-C-133	Macumu hill in Kikangula	King Kabarega resided here during his battles with the British (footprint prints are available)					More images Upload another image
UG-C-134	Kirooro	Nyinamwiru, the daughter of Bukuku, mother of Ndaula the Cwezi King, lived here					Upload an image
UG-C-135	Kyawaikaakata, Lwampanga sub-county	Kabalega and Mwanga were detained here before they were exiled to Seychelles					Upload an image
UG-C-136	Wakibombo	NRA Mass grave					Upload an image
UG-C-137	Muduuma tombs	Tomb of Winyi III Ruguluka Macolya					Upload an image
UG-C-138	Kamuswagas' palace	King of Kooki royal residence	Rakai				Upload an image
UG-C-139	Serinya Tombs	Kooki Kingdom royal burial grounds					Upload an image
UG-C-140	Simba Hills Monument Kasambya Fort ?	K.A.R.1914–18, Simba site, and a spot to view Lake Victoria					Upload an image
UG-C-141	Kasozi church	At Katuntu is the second oldest Catholic church					Upload an image
UG-C-142	Muzimu Caves	At Kasabya are ritual caves					Upload an image
UG-C-143	Rwanda Genocide Memorial	Graves at Kacencero/Kyebe/Rwandan genocide graves					Upload an image
UG-C-144	Katubi Tombs	Royal Burial grounds					Upload an image
UG-C-145	Kyarurangira	Hippos view					Upload an image
UG-C-146	Kiya hill	Archaeological sites of early Stone Age works					Upload an image
UG-C-147	Kigera cave	Along Kyotera-Mutukula road, it became popular during the pre-colonial wars between the Baziba of Karagwe					Upload an image
UG-C-148	Bigo bya Mugyenyi	Earth works, Archaeological Site Cwezi 13th- century to 16th century	Ssembabule				Upload an image
UG-C-149	Ntusi earthworks	Earth works, archaeological site Cwezi, capital 11th century					Upload an image
UG-C-150	Kasonko earthworks	Earthworks, Archaeological site					Upload an image
UG-C-151	Bwogero Basin	Several scrapped depressions and mounds, associated with rituals of the Cwezi					Upload an image
UG-C-152	Equator Crossing at Nshozi	Small Monument signifying equator crossing					Upload an image
UG-C-153	Lwentale Lyamugyenyi	Granite rock with rock sounds					Upload an image
UG-C-154	Hippo bay cave Entebbe	Archaeological, Oldowan and Acheulean tools site	Wakiso				Upload an image
UG-C-155	Omuti gwe Ddembe, Entebbe	Freedom site where Ignatious Musaazi held independence struggle meetings	Wakiso				More images Upload another image
UG-C-156	Kigungu, Monument and Church	First catholic church Laudel & Amans Catholic missionaries landing, Mapeera monuments and church 1879	Wakiso				More images Upload another image
UG-C-157	Bugonga Church and Tree	Farther Laudel landed at Rigungu but camped at Bugonga	Wakiso				More images Upload another image
UG-C-158	St Johns Church, Entebbe	Built by the first colonial Anglican masters in Entebbe, is one of the oldest buildings	Wakiso				More images Upload another image
UG-C-159	Entebbe Cinema Hall	One of the first cinema halls used by colonial masters to watch films when Entebbe was headquarters	Wakiso				Upload another image
UG-C-160	Luzira Figurines	Iron Age stone tools including pottery(the Luzira Head at the Uganda Museum)	Wakiso				Upload an image
UG-C-161	Mpangas Shrine, Luzira	(Ekigwa)	Wakiso				Upload an image
UG-C-162	Buloba hill	Dimple based pottery	Wakiso				Upload an image
UG-C-163	Kazi, Busabala	Kazi Yacht Club meeting place of Stanley an Muteesa in 1875	Wakiso				Upload an image
UG-C-164	Nalukolongo Martyrs	Museum	Wakiso				More images Upload another image
UG-C-165	Namugongo Matyrs shrine	At Buloori is the catholic shrine	Wakiso				More images Upload another image
UG-C-166	Namugongo Matyrs shrine	At Kyaliwajala is the Protestant shrine	Wakiso				More images Upload another image
UG-C-167	Mamugongo Masgid Nuru	At Buloori, Moslem martyrs	Wakiso				Upload an image
UG-C-168	Kalemas Komera Katereke	Prison ditch for Buganda prince and Princesses	Wakiso				Upload another image
UG-C-169	Muganzi Lwaza Komera	Prison ditch located in Kisalosalo, Kyebando	Wakiso				Upload an image
UG-C-170	Muganzi Lwaza tombs mounds	Located in Kazo, Mpererwe – tombs and mounds	Wakiso				Upload an image
UG-C-171	Bagala yazze Tombs	At Mpererwe are tombs of Namasole Bagalayazze mother to Kabaka Mwanga II	Wakiso				Upload an image
UG-C-172	Kyabagu Tombs Kyebando	Tombs of the 25th king of Buganda, Kyabagu ruled, 1750–1780	Wakiso				Upload an image
UG-C-173	Kiwewea Tombs	At Masanafu Kiwewa	Wakiso				Upload an image
UG-C-174	Kimeras Shrine	Kabaka Kimeras jaw bone	Wakiso				Upload an image
UG-C-175	Kongoje Shrines	Jaw bone shrines of Kabaka Nakibinge, Sekamanya and Mutebi	Wakiso				Upload an image
UG-C-176	Equator crossing	In Lake Victoria Island	Wakiso				Upload an image
UG-C-177	Sir Apollo Kagwa	At Manyangwa is a mausoleum, residential house, and church	Wakiso				Upload another image
UG-C-178	LEGICO Assembly building (currently housing NARO)	Seat of Uganda's first legislative council, parliament established by the British colonial government in 1920 by then all MPs were whites!! (NARO)	Wakiso				More images Upload another image
UG-C-179	Old airport Entebbe	First (old airport, Israel's raid during Idi Amin's regime	Wakiso				Upload another image
UG-C-180	Muzinga Square		Wakiso				More images Upload another image
UG-C-181	Entebbe za Mugula		Wakiso				More images Upload another image
UG-C-182	Lunyo Well	Well traditionally used by Kabaka of Buganda	Wakiso				Upload another image
UG-C-183	Gombe	War memorial mass graves	Wakiso				More images Upload another image
UG-C-184	Masulita	War memorial mass graves	Wakiso				Upload an image
UG-C-185	Kireka Wakiso	War memorial mass graves	Wakiso				Upload an image
UG-C-186	Kakiri	War memorial mass graves	Wakiso				Upload an image
UG-C-187	Namayumba	War memorial mass graves	Wakiso				Upload an image
UG-C-188	Busukuma	War memorial mass graves	Wakiso				Upload an image
UG-C-189	Kasanje	War memorial mass graves	Wakiso				Upload an image
UG-C-190	Kireka Palace	Current King Mutebi's official residence	Wakiso				Upload an image
UG-C-191	Banda Palace hill	Meeting place of Speke and Mutesa of 1862/also for Kabaka Mutebi	Wakiso				Upload an image
UG-C-192	Gayaza	Sangoan culture similar to Sango Bay	Wakiso				Upload an image
UG-C-193	Bulamu Palace	In Kasangati. Shrine/sacred place for Ndaula, Kiwanuka, and Wanemas spirits	Wakiso				Upload an image
UG-C-194	Ndaulas Shrine	At Kakooge, Buwaali	Wakiso				Upload an image
UG-C-195	Kakungurus House	Historic building at Kirinya	Wakiso				Upload an image
UG-C-196	Ziika Forest	Bemba's cave and indigenous herbal tress	Wakiso				Upload an image
UG-C-197	Mpanga Forest	Bird species and herbal trees and shrubs	Wakiso				Upload an image
UG-C-198	Entebbe Botanical Gardens	Exhibition of a variety of plants and herbs	Wakiso				More images Upload another image
UG-C-199	Lutembe bay	Forests and bird species	Wakiso				Upload an image
UG-C-200	Lunyo Police station	First police station in Uganda	Wakiso				Upload an image

== See also ==
- National Cultural Sites of Uganda for other National Cultural Sites in Uganda
