= Al-Nilin Mosque =

Mosque in Omdurman, Sudan

- مسجد النيلين

- Location within Sudan

Religion
- Affiliation: Sunni Islam
- Ecclesiastical or organisational status: Mosque
- Status: Active

Location
- Location: Omdurman
- Country: Sudan
- Interactive map of Al-Nilin Mosque
- Coordinates: 15°37′04″N 32°29′16″E

Architecture
- Type: Mosque
- Completed: 1984

Specifications
- Dome: 1
- Minaret: 1

The Al-Nilin Mosque (Arabic: مسجد النيلين, lit. 'Mosque of the two Niles' ) is a mosque in Omdurman, Sudan. It is located on the western banks of the Nile river, just opposite to the confluence of the White and Blue Nile. It was established in the 1970s during the Nimeiry era of Sudan, and since then remains one of the fine architectural religious venues in the country.

== History ==
The design of the mosque was a thesis project by Gamer Eldawla Eltahir, a student at the University of Khartoum. It was selected for construction by the president of Sudan Jaafar Nimeiry. The mosque was completed in 1984.

== See also ==
- Islam in Sudan
- List of mosques in Africa
