= Lobatse Mosque =

Mosque in Lobatse, South-East, Botswana

- Location within Botswana

Religion
- Affiliation: Islam
- Ecclesiastical or organisational status: Mosque
- Status: Active

Location
- Location: Lobatse, South-East
- Country: Botswana
- Coordinates: 25°14′01.4″S 25°39′52.8″E

Architecture
- Type: Mosque architecture
- Founder: Botswana Muslim Association
- Established: 1967

The Lobatse Mosque is a mosque in Lobatse, South-East District, Botswana.

== History ==
The mosque was built by the Botswana Muslim Association and completed in 1967, making it the oldest in the country.

== See also ==
- Islam in Botswana
