= Windhoek Islamic Center =

Mosque in Windhoek, Khomas, Namibia

- Location within Namibia

Religion
- Affiliation: Islam
- Ecclesiastical or organizational status: Mosque
- Status: Active

Location
- Location: Windhoek, Khomas, Namibia
- Interactive map of Windhoek Islamic Center
- Coordinates: 22°34′11″S 17°04′34″E

Architecture
- Type: Mosque architecture
- Established: 1986

The Windhoek Islamic Center or Soweto Islamic Centre is a mosque in Windhoek, Khomas Region, Namibia.

== History ==
The center was established in 1986.

== See also ==
- Islam in Namibia
