= Historic house architecture in Morocco =

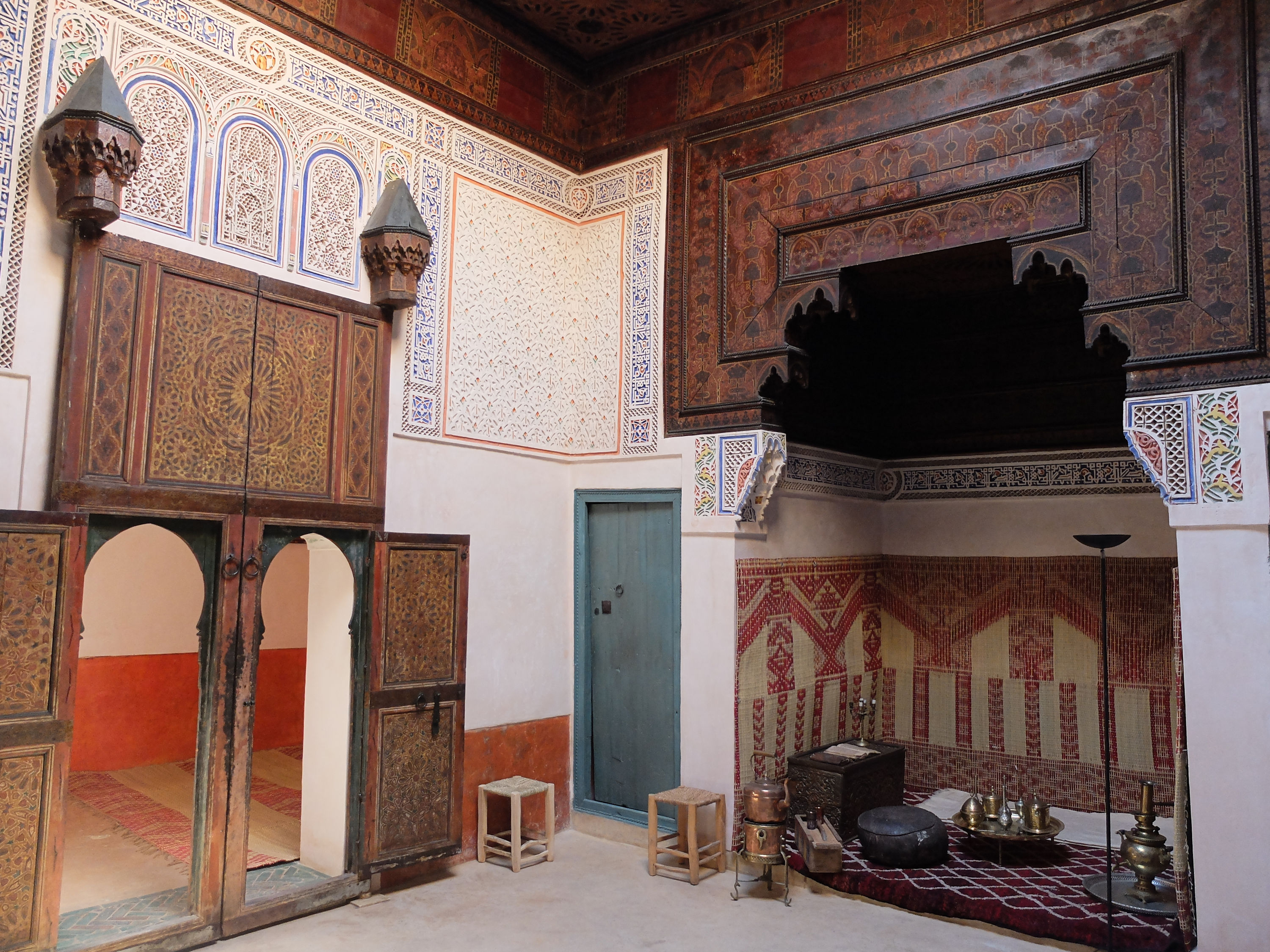
Restored historic apartment in the Mouassine Museum in Marrakesh, with examples of carved and painted decoration in wood and stucco

Traditional houses in Morocco are usually centered around a large internal courtyard, the wast ad-dar, and are characterized by a focus on interior decoration rather than on external appearance. The houses of wealthy residents featured decoration typical of Moroccan architecture and medieval Moorish architecture, including carved and painted wood, carved stucco, and zellij (mosaic tilework). The center of larger houses could also be occupied by a riad garden (Arabic: رياض), particularly in places like Marrakesh where more space was available.

The oldest surviving houses and mansions in Morocco today are from the Marinid period (13th to 15th centuries) or the following Saadi period (16th and early 17th centuries), while a larger number of examples have survived from later centuries. In the context of modern tourism in Morocco, many traditional houses have been converted into hotels or guesthouses that are popularly referred to as "riads".

== General characteristics ==
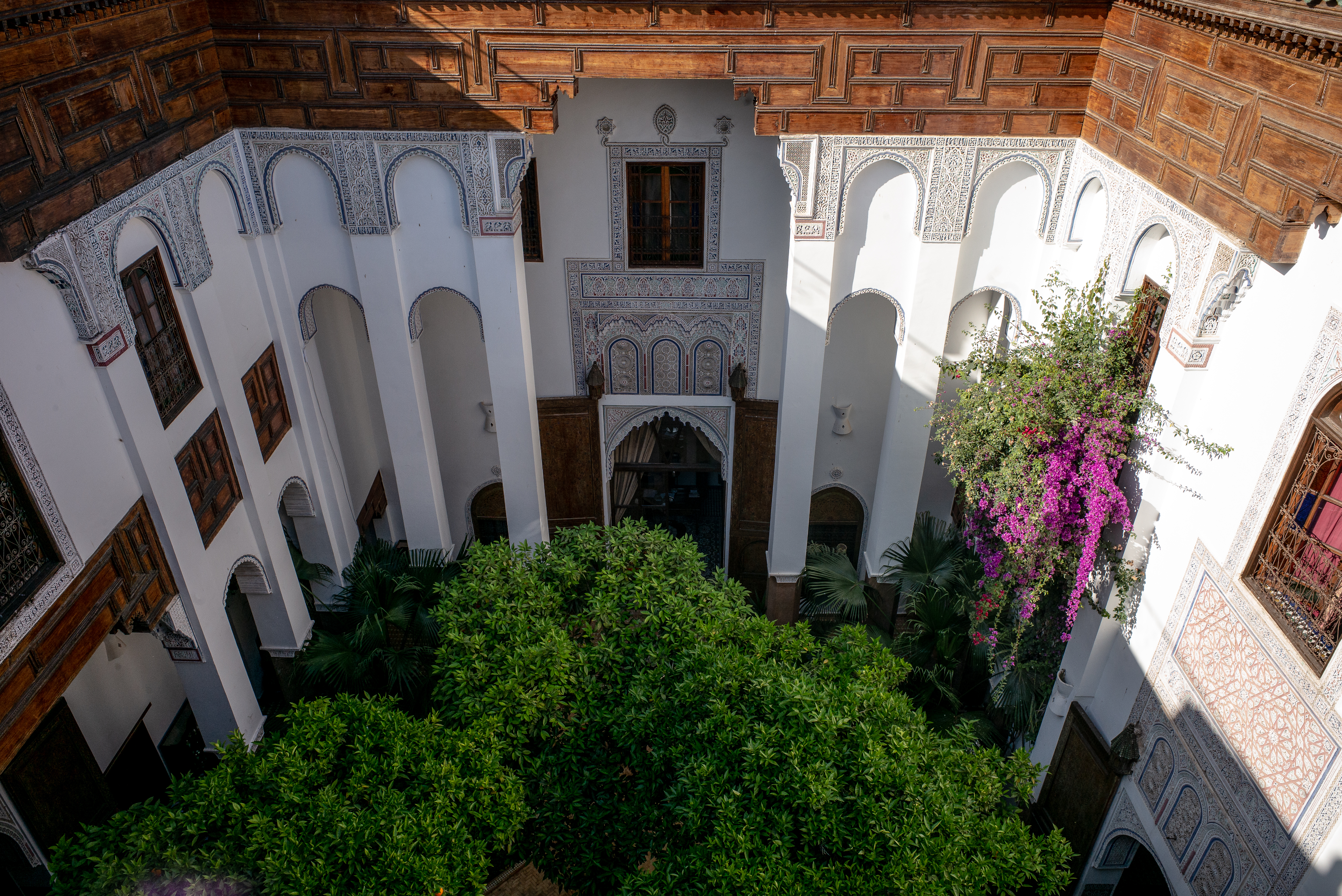
Central courtyard of a traditional house in Fes

Traditional Moroccan houses can be divided into two categories: the dar (Arabic: دار) and the riyad or riad (Arabic: رياض). Both are organized around a central courtyard or patio, known as the wast ad-dar (Arabic: وسط الدار, lit. 'middle of the house'). The dar is usually a house where this central space is paved or unplanted, while the riyad is a house where the central space is primarily occupied by a garden. In both cases, the central space is often surrounded by a gallery or portico. These galleries have an arcade along the inner side (facing the center of the courtyard) and walls on the outer side through which other rooms and sections branch off.

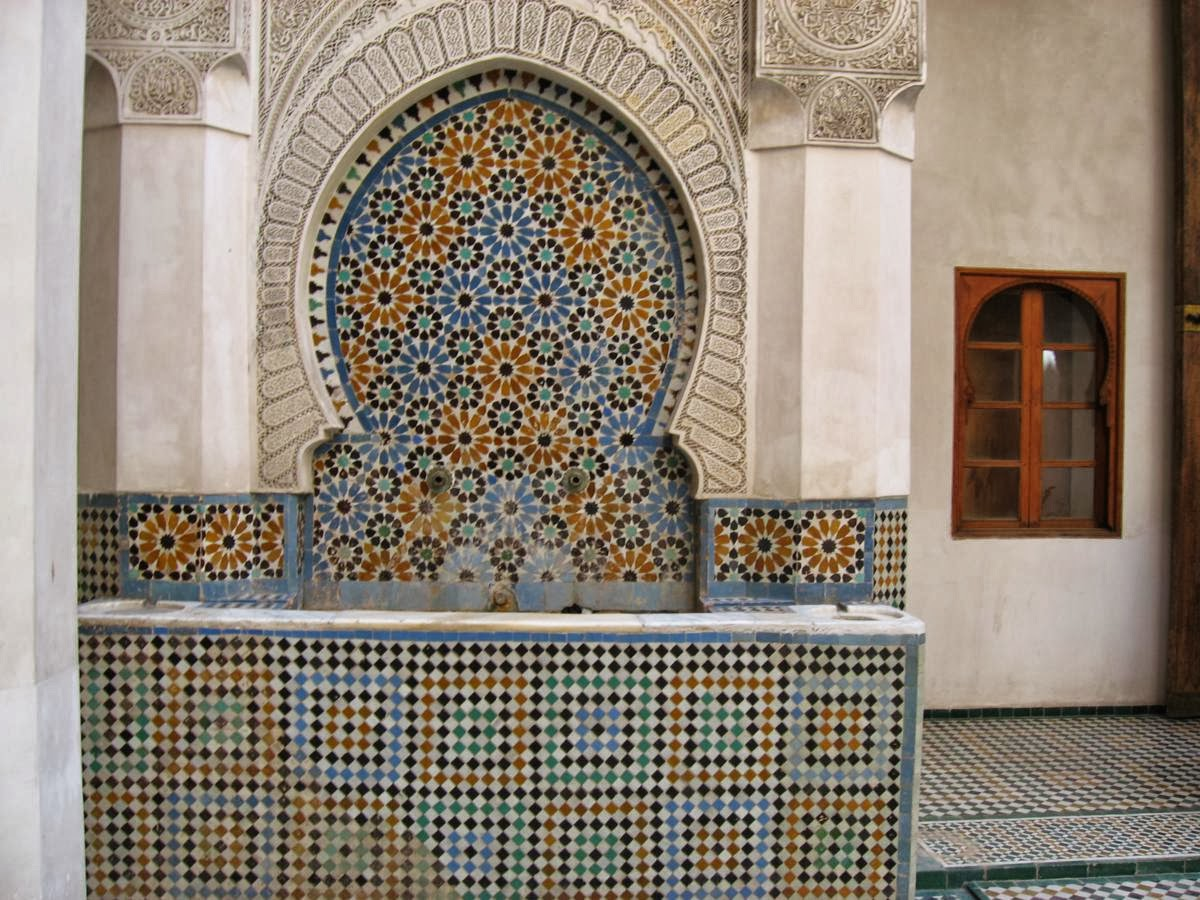
Zellij tilework on a fountain in the Dar Adiyel in Fes

Houses are focused inward: even rich mansions are usually completely unadorned on the outside, with all decoration concentrated on the inside. There were few, if any, large windows on the outside. The entrance, which leads to the courtyard, is typically a bent entrance that prevents outsiders on the street from seeing directly into the house. As with other traditional Moroccan structures, the interior decoration includes carved stucco, sculpted and painted wood, and zellij tilework.

The central patio/courtyard, the wast ad-dar, is thus the centerpiece of the house. The size and craftsmanship of this interior space was an indication of the status and wealth of its owners, rather than the house's external appearance. In the riyad house this courtyard is occupied by an interior garden, often planted with trees. The garden courtyard is normally rectangular and divided into four parts along its central axes, with two straight paths intersecting in the middle, where a fountain is usually present. In Morocco, riads became especially widespread in the palaces and mansions of Marrakesh, where the combination of available space and warm climate made them particularly appealing.

Traditional Moroccan house architecture is also similar to that found in the rest of the Maghreb, such as in Algeria and Tunisia. However, Ottoman influence (from the 16th century onward) is more evident in the houses of cities like Algiers and Tunis. The differences also increase when comparing with traditional house architecture further east, in Cairo, Damascus, and other cities of the eastern Mediterranean.

== Origins ==
Courtyard houses, like those in Moroccan architecture, have historical antecedents in the houses and villas of the Greco-Roman Mediterranean world and even earlier in the ancient Middle East. Riyad gardens, more specifically, probably originated in Persian architecture (where they're known as chahar bagh) and became a prominent feature in Moorish palaces in Spain (such Madinat al-Zahra, the Aljaferia and the Alhambra). In Morocco, the earliest known example of a true riyad garden (with a symmetrical four-part division) was found in the Almoravid palace built by Ali ibn Yusuf in Marrakesh in the early 12th century, next to what is now the Kutubiyya Mosque.

The inward focus of Moroccan house architecture may have been partly encouraged by the values of Islamic society, which placed emphasis on privacy and encouraged a separation between private family spaces – where women generally lived and worked – and semi-public spaces where outside guests were received. Nonetheless, pre-Islamic traditions of domestic architecture in the Mediterranean and Africa were also at the origin of this model. These two factors likely contributed together to making the courtyard house the near-universal model of traditional Moroccan houses. It is unclear to what extent Moroccan riads and houses were inspired by models imported by immigrants from al-Andalus (present-day Spain), where many early examples have also survived, or to what extent they developed locally in parallel with Andalusi versions. What is certain, however, is that there was historically a close cultural and geopolitical relationship between the two lands on either side of the Strait of Gibraltar, and that the palaces of Granada, for example, were thus similar to those of Fes in the same period.

== House architecture up to the 16th century ==
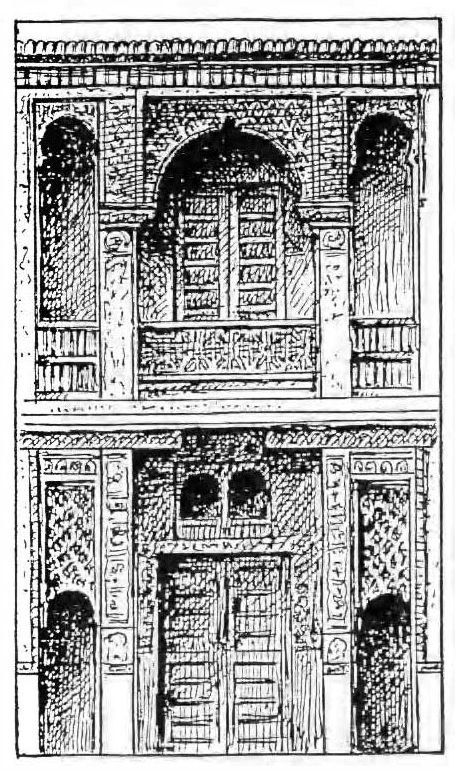
Alfred Bel's sketch of one of the gallery facades of the courtyard of a 14th-century house, studied in 1914 right before its demolition. The house contained many classic elements of later Moroccan houses and its decoration was similar to that of Marinid madrasas of the time.

A number of historic bourgeois mansions have survived across the country, mostly from the 'Alawi era but some dating as far back as the Marinid or Saadi periods in Fes and Marrakesh. In Fes, in the early 20th century, one richly decorated house from the beginning of the 14th century (the early Marinid period) was studied and documented by Alfred Bel before it was demolished by its owners. Built in brick, its form and decoration bore very strong similarities with the Marinid madrasas built in Fes in the same period, revealing a shared ornamental repertoire and craftsmanship between madrasas and domestic architecture. Beyond this, the overall layout was also comparable to the Muslim houses of Granada and demonstrated many classic features of medieval Moroccan houses that are often repeated in later examples. It had a central square courtyard surrounded by a two-story gallery, from which rooms opened on every side on both stories. The rooms were wide but not very deep, so as to preserve the overall square floor plan of the building with the courtyard at its center. The main rooms opened through tall arched doorways with wooden double doors. Above these doorways on the ground floor were windows that allowed light from the courtyard to enter the rooms behind. While not completely symmetrical, each façade of the courtyard gallery consisted of a tall, wide central arch and two narrow side arches. This arrangement resulted in a cluster of three pillars at each corner of the courtyard. The top of the central arches in the lower-floor gallery consisted of a two-tiered or corbelled wooden lintel instead of a round arch, while the two smaller side arches were round and much shorter. The vertical spaces above the side arches were filled with ornate stucco decoration based on a sebka motif, similar to some of the decorated surfaces in the Marinid madrasas of the city. The lower parts of the brick pillars were covered in zellij tiles. In the upper-floor gallery, the central arches were round and their spandrels were filled with the same kind of stucco decoration. The two smaller arches to either side had a similar form. The wooden lintels above the arches were carved with vegetal motifs and floriated Kufic letters. Although the house is now gone, pieces of its stucco decoration have been preserved in the Dar Batha museum in Fes.

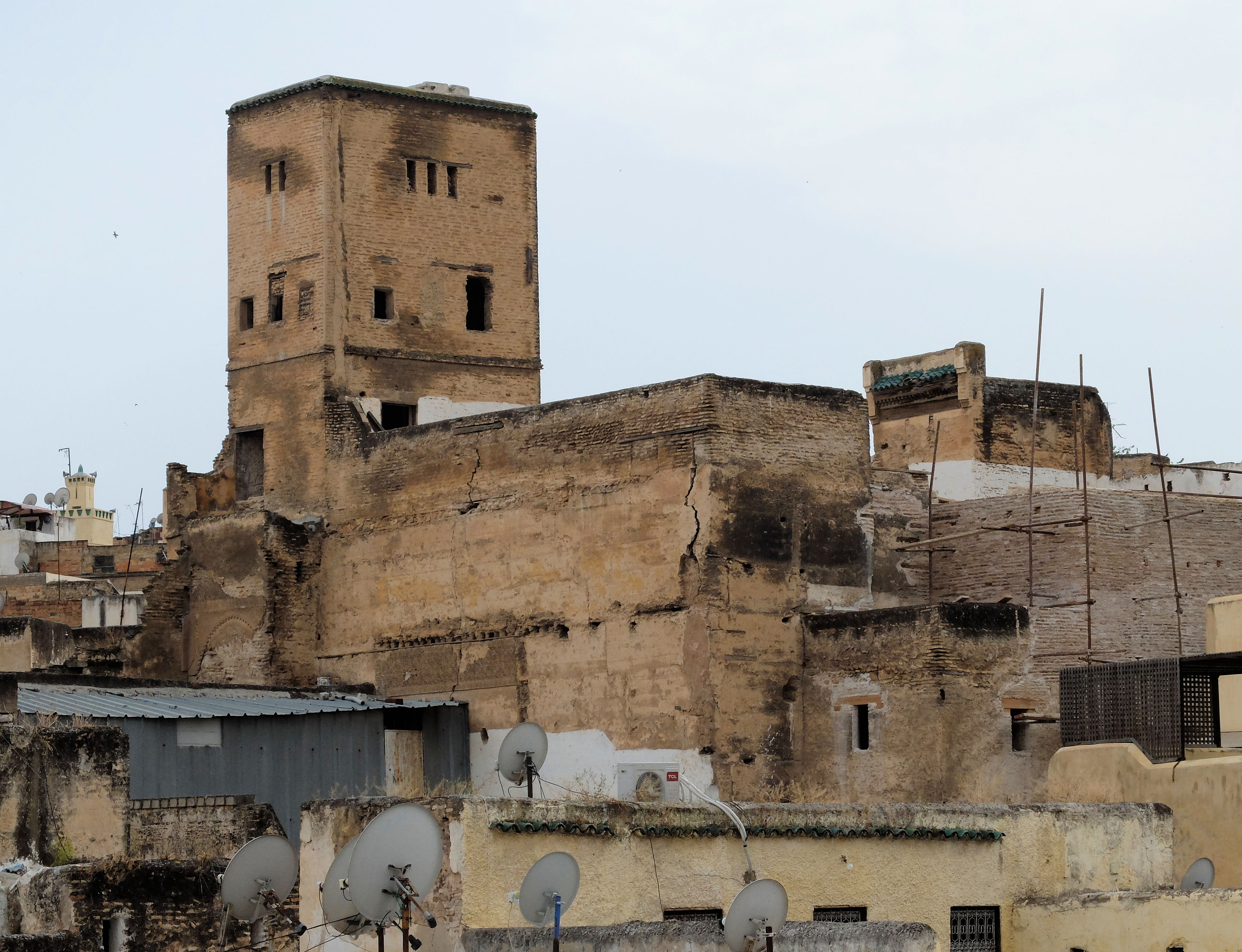
Rooftop view of Dar Demana (prior to recent restoration), a Marinid-era house with a menzeh or observation tower

After the demolition of this early documented medieval house, another Marinid-era house (probably 14th century), known as Dar Sfairia or Dar al-Fasiyin, was studied by Henri Terrasse and Boris Maslow, of similar form but more modest. It too was demolished in the late 20th century. Several other houses possibly dating to the Marinid era or to the Saadi era have been studied since then by Jacques Revault, Lucien Golvin and Ali Amahan in their study of the houses of Fes. They all feature variations on the same overall form as the house studied by Alfred Bel: a central square courtyard surrounded by rooms which opened through tall archway doors, sometimes with windows above the ground floor doorways, and often behind a two-story gallery. While most houses have a simpler arrangement of one pillar at the corners of the gallery, larger mansions such as Dar Lazreq (owned by the Lazreq family since the 19th century) and Dar Demana (built by the Ouazzani family) have clusters of three pillars at each corner (for twelve pillars in total), repeating the motif of a gallery with large central openings flanked by smaller arches. Wooden lintels forming corbelled arches in the galleries is a common feature throughout, sometimes carved with vegetal or epigraphic decoration and sometimes supported by ornate stucco corbels. Dar Lazreq, which likely dates to the 15th or 16th century, features the same kind of sebka-based stucco decoration in the spaces above the small side arches of its courtyard gallery. Dar Demana, which dates in style to the Marinid period but may have been founded earlier, is further distinguished by a short lookout tower (a menzeh) on its roof terrace, allowing its owners to enjoy a better view of the city. This menzeh was a feature of some mansions in both Fes and Marrakesh. It is also adjoined by a separate riad garden, a feature which was not previously common in the architecture of Fes. Both Dar Demana and Dar Lazreq were recently restored in the 2010s.

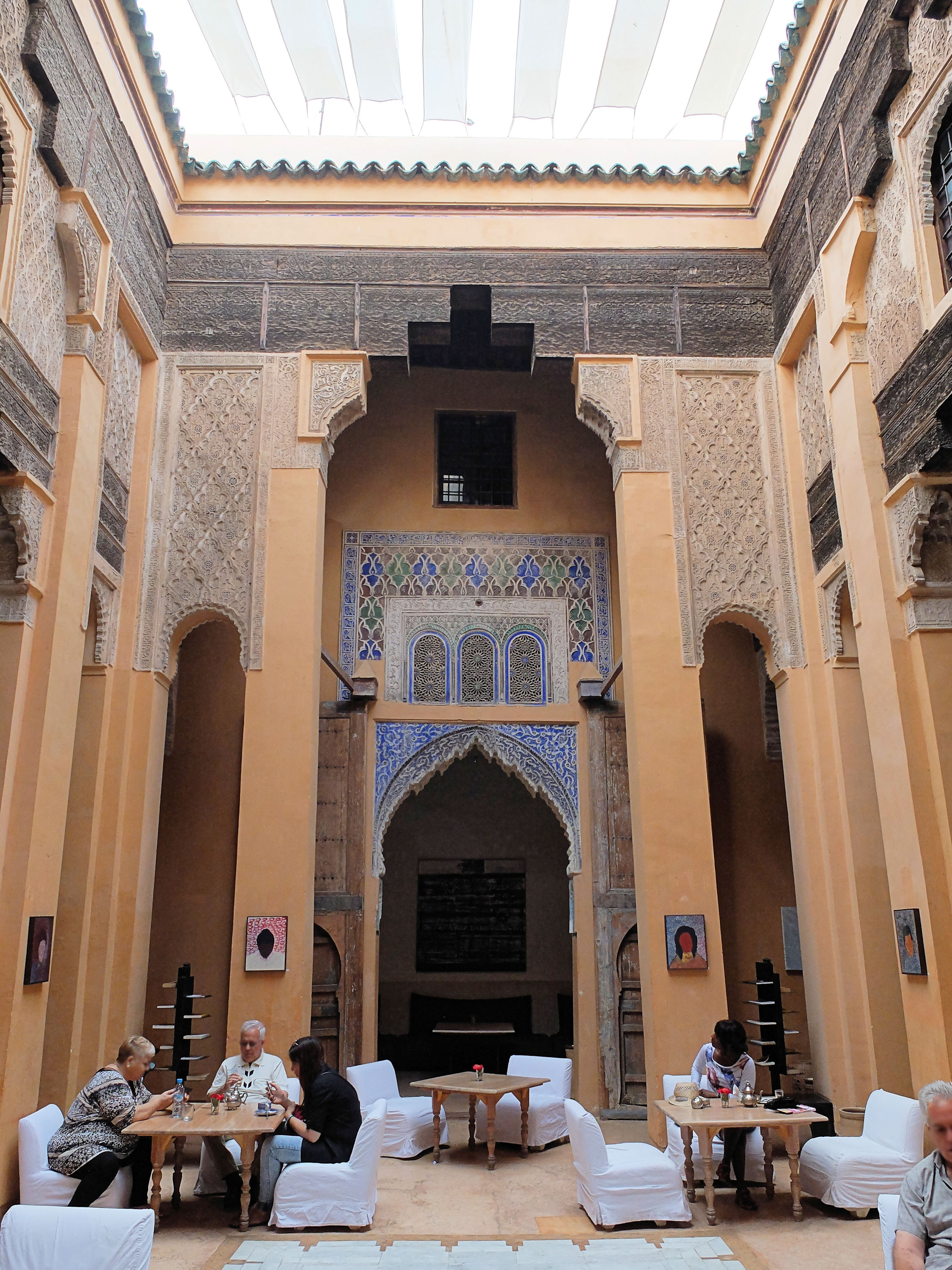
Dar Cherifa, a restored Saadi-era house in Marrakesh with similarities to earlier Marinid-era houses in Fes, with its arrangement of twelve pillars, stucco decoration, and wooden corbelled arches

The oldest surviving houses in Marrakesh date from the Saadi period during the 16th and early 17th centuries. A number of such houses still stand today in various states of preservation. These include the Dar Cherifa (formerly known as Dar Ijimi), the Dar al-Mas'udiyyin (partly ruined), and the Dar al-Masluhiyyin (restored and now also known as Ksour Agafay). The Mouassine Museum also contains an example of a restored Saadi-era douiria, or upper-floor guest apartment. Dar Cherifa and the Dar al-Mas'udiyyin in particular have very rich decoration which has strong similarities with the stucco and wood decoration of the Ben Youssef Madrasa, indicating that they were probably built around the same time (second half of the 16th century). They continue the traditional forms of earlier Marinid houses, with the twelve pillar-courtyard arrangement, carved wooden lintels in the galleries, and carved stucco decoration with sebka motifs around or above the arches. Unlike the Fes houses, however, the galleries consist of only one tall level. In some cases a second story of rooms is integrated behind the upper façades of the galleries. The large central openings of the galleries once again allow for unobstructed view of the tall decorated doorways leading to the surrounding rooms. In these Marrakesh houses, these formal doorways are even more ornate and consist of lambrequin arches with muqarnas-sculpted intrados.

== House architecture after the 16th century ==
Twentieth-century scholar George Marçais, in his overview of architecture in the region, divided the architecture of later Moroccan houses into three general categories: the houses of Fes, Meknes, and northern Morocco; the houses of Marrakesh and southern Morocco; and the houses of Rabat, Salé, and the western coastal cities.

=== Fes, Meknes, and northern Morocco ===
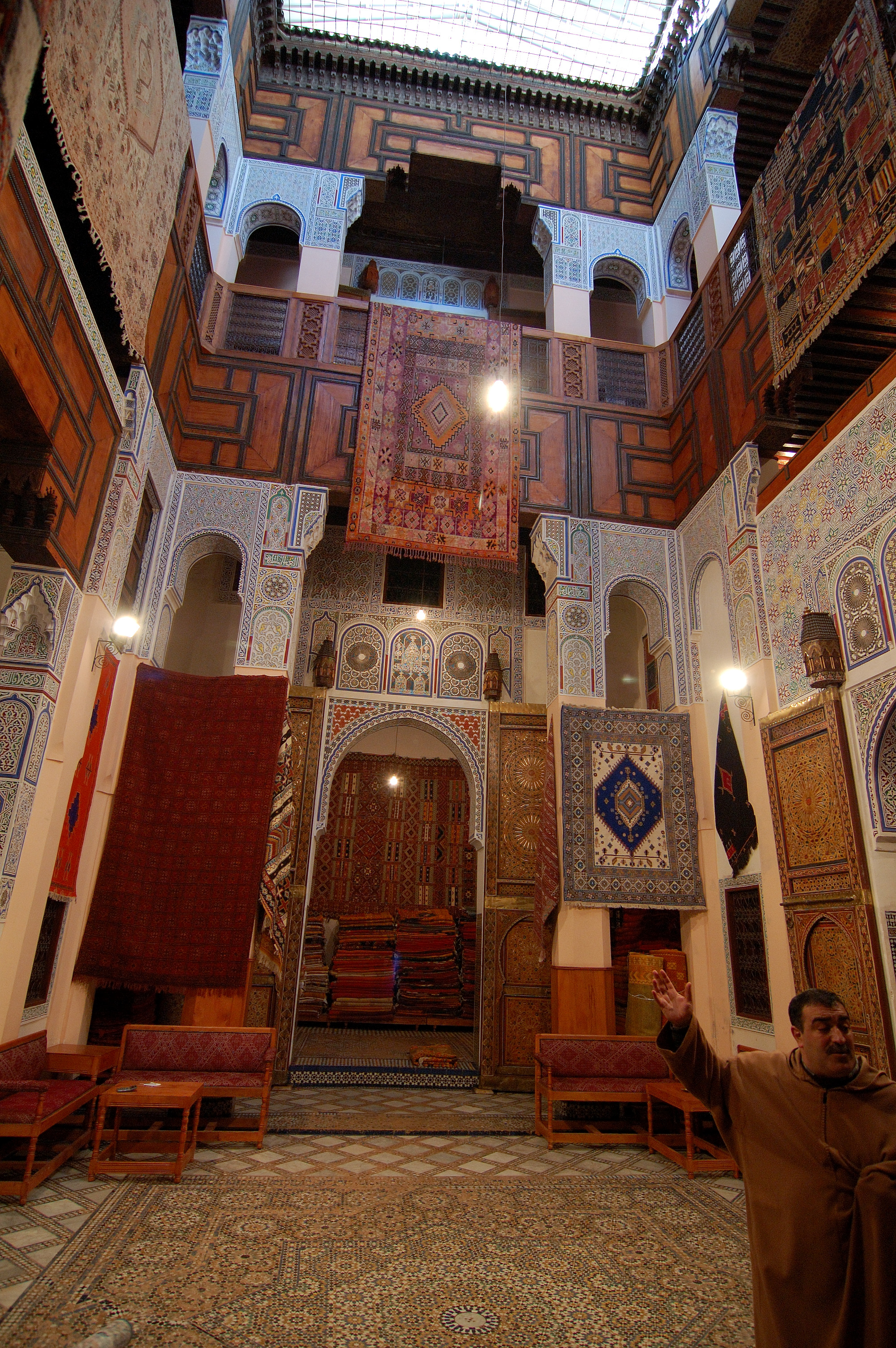
Traditional house in Fes (now a carpet shop), with a classic two-story gallery with large central openings flanked by smaller side arches

In Fes and Meknes, the architectural traditions established earlier continued. Houses were most commonly built in brick, though those with thicker walls were often built with rammed earth. More so than in other cities, the houses of Fes are tall and have narrower floor plans, with their internal patios having the semblance of a deep well or skylight rather than an open courtyard. In Meknès the same is true, though to a lesser extent. In the rich houses of these cities the central patios are among the most finely decorated in the country. The lower parts of the walls and pillars are usually covered in zellij tiles, the upper surfaces are covered in carved stucco (or in smooth plaster for more modest houses), and the tops of the galleries were lined with heavy wooden lintels, forming corbelled arches as in earlier Marinid and Saadi examples. The wooden elements – including doors, ceilings, and the gallery lintels – were typically made of cedar wood and were richly carved and painted. Wealthier homes had reception rooms at ground level, opening off the patio, which were equally if not even more richly decorated, sometimes with elaborate wooden cupola ceilings. This style was in turn found in other cities in the region of the Moroccan north such as Ouazzane, Taza, and Moulay Idriss Zerhoun, though often in less lavish form.

=== Marrakesh and southern Morocco ===
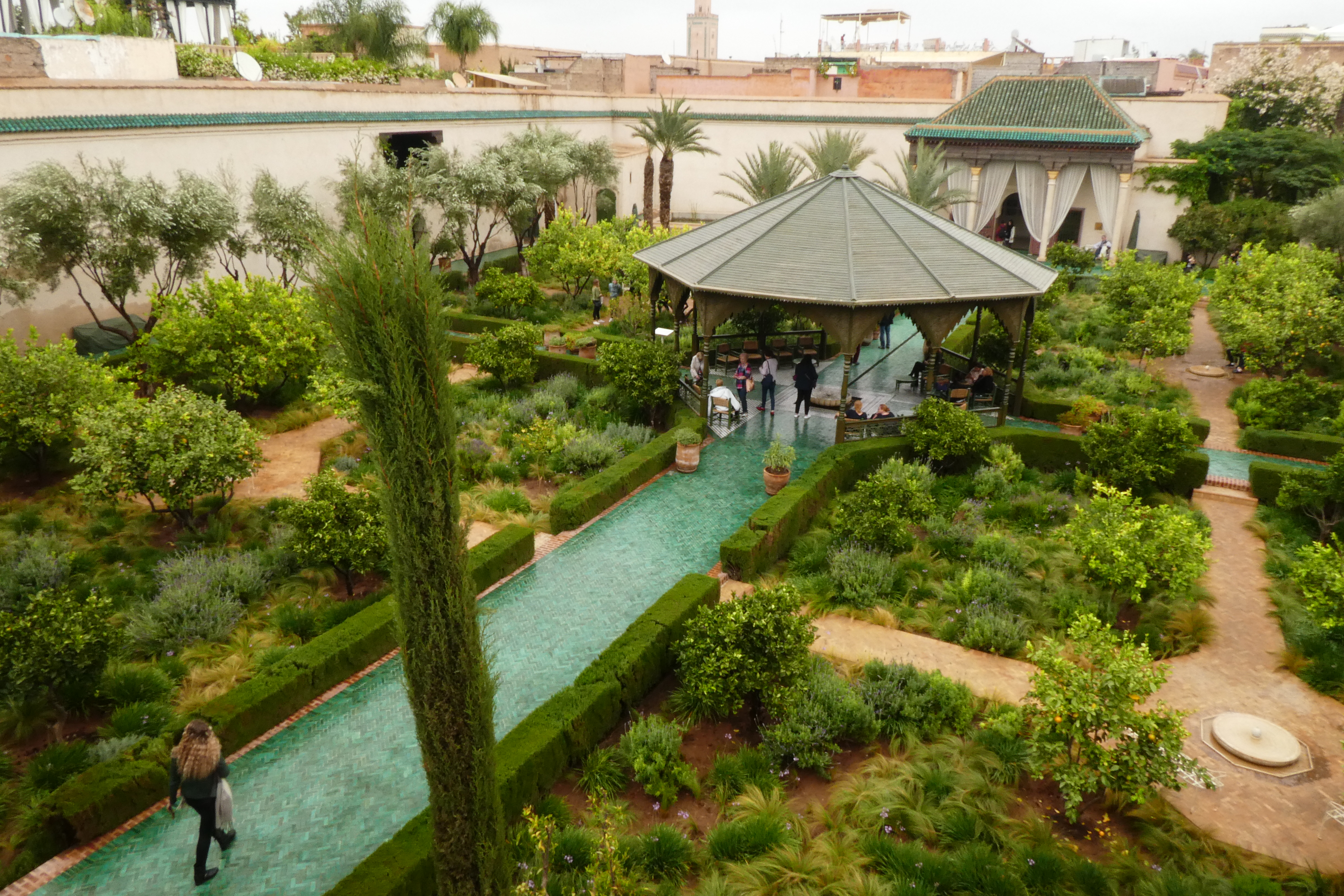
A large riad garden (Le Jardin Secret) in Marrakesh, part of a former private mansion rebuilt in the 19th century

In Marrakesh the flat landscape and ample space within its city walls meant that houses could have larger courtyards and fewer stories, in contrast with those of Fez. Most older houses had only a ground floor, or at most an upper floor with a low ceiling used for storage. Larger and richer houses often contained riad gardens, which were more common in Marrakesh than in other cities. Houses were built in brick or rammed earth, with wood being used again for certain elements. Wooden corbelled arches seen in older houses became less common in more recent centuries and round or ogival brick arches were favoured instead. In turn, horseshoe arches became rarer after the 18th century. Walls were covered with plaster which historically had a rose, reddish, or yellowish colour, and sometimes enlivened with friezes of painted motifs. Zellij was used in reception rooms and around fountains. Window frames and doorframes are often highlighted with carved stucco. The carving of motifs into wood, on the other hand, became less common over time and by the late 19th century wooden decoration was limited to painted decoration. This painted decoration also evolved, however, increasing the use of floral motifs and typically employing a red background.

=== Salé, Rabat, and the coastal cities ===
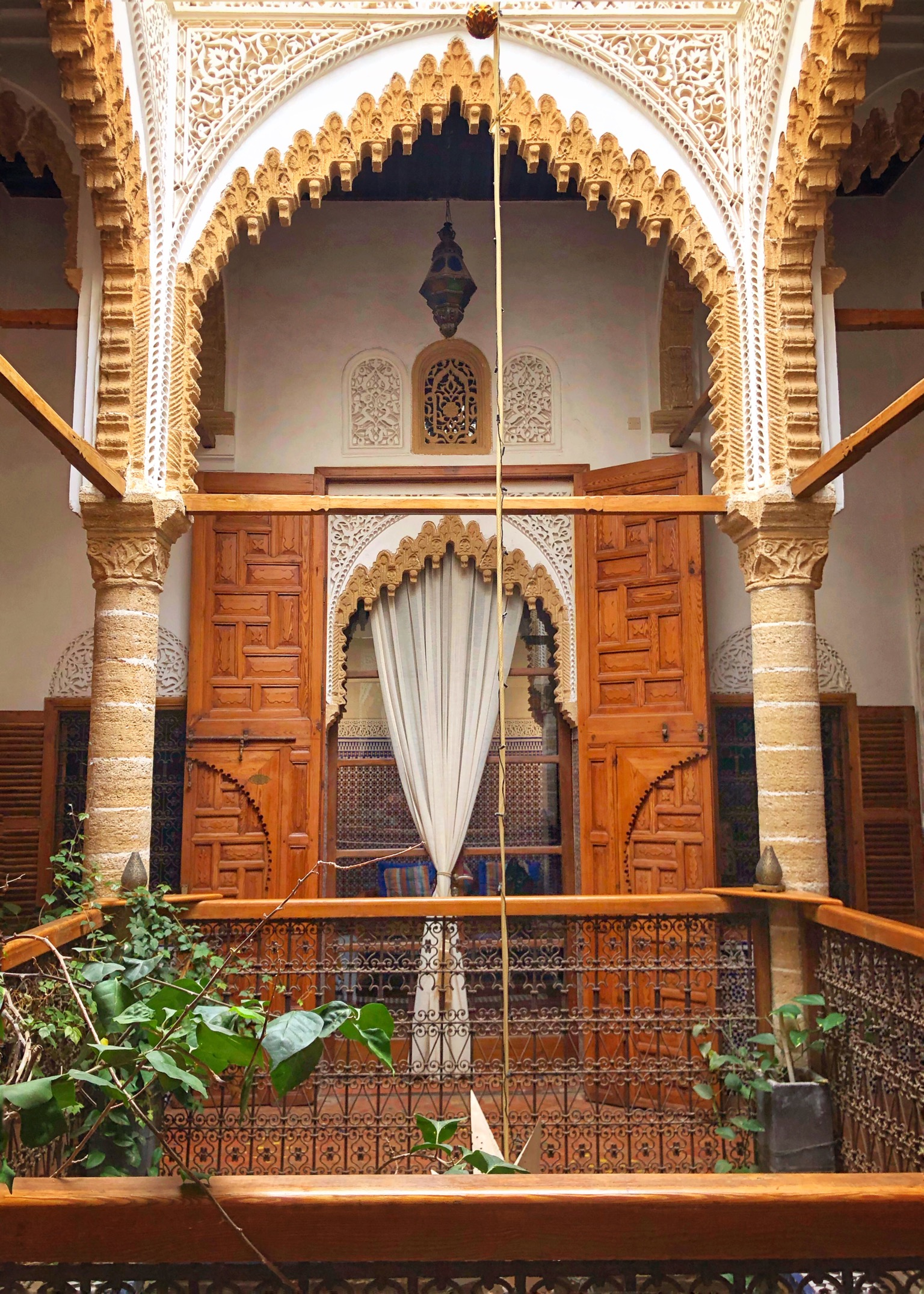
A traditional house in Rabat (now serving as a riad hotel)

In Salé and Rabat houses were more typically built in rubble masonry, with cut stone used in the corners of walls and for the outlines of arches. The central patios were of moderate size and surrounded by galleries more often made of stone. The arches of the galleries are round, polylobed, or sculpted in muqarnas, supported by columns made of stone drums ending in capitals carved with arabesque motifs like acanthus leaves. The use of stone, which was available from the limestone quarries in the Bou Regreg valley, enabled houses in these cities to have more slender columns and thinner walls that allowed for more light and more elegant architectural proportions. Older houses generally had only a ground floor, and ceilings were simple and unadorned, in contrast with the houses of Marrakesh and Fes. Both external and internal walls are typically whitewashed.

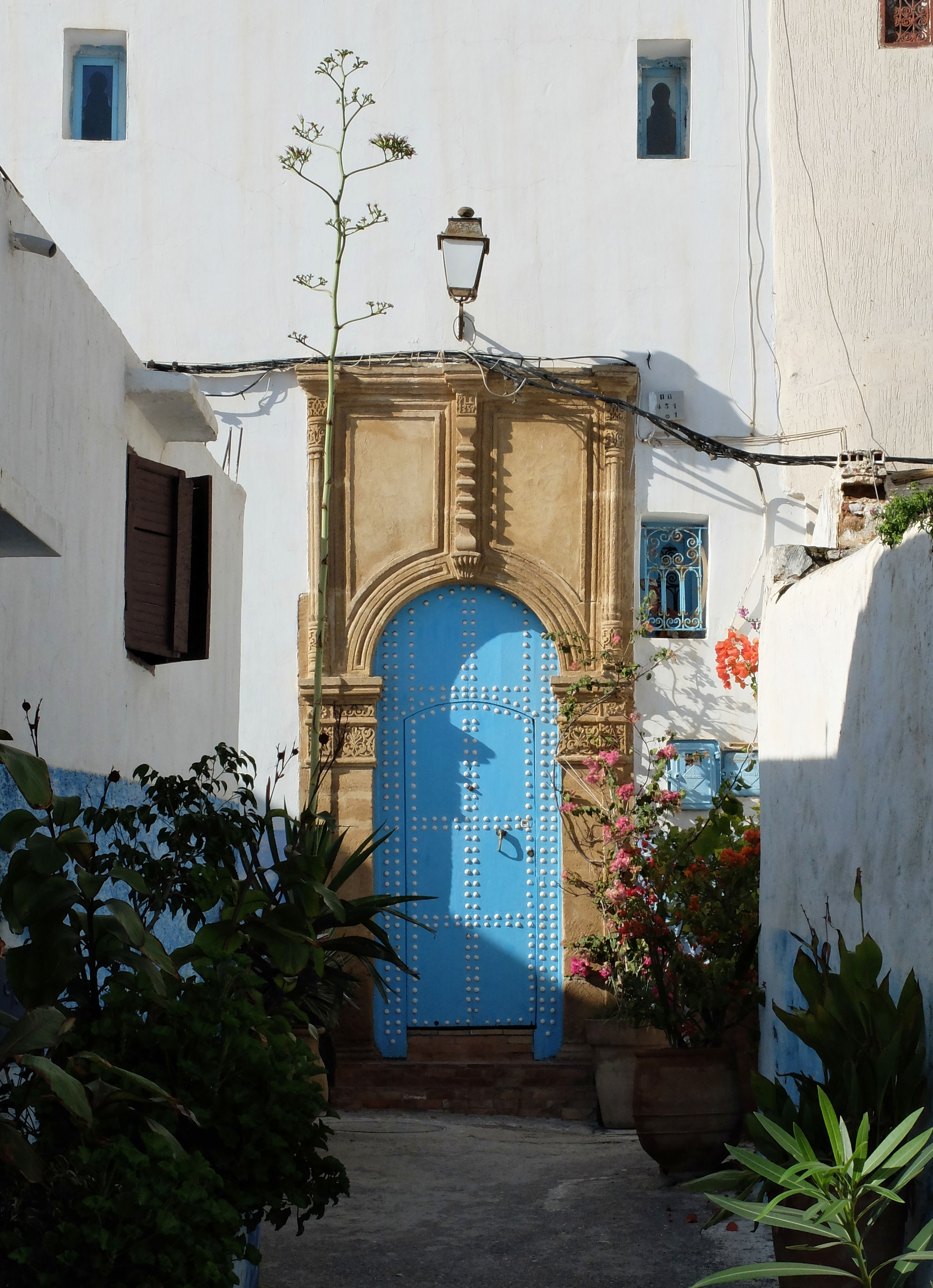
Characteristic stone doorway in the Kasbah of Rabat

One of the most distinguishing features of this regional style are the outer entrances, whose doorways are made in cut stone. These stone facades are frequently decorated with a sculpted molding around their edges and a sculpted keystone motif at the top of the doorway arch. Although some of these doorways, especially in Salé, are carved with decorative arabesque reliefs, in most areas they have a semi-European appearance. George Marçais attributes this stylistic feature to the influence of Spanish Renaissance architecture, which would have been imported to this region by the Morisco refugees who were expelled from Spain at the beginning of the 17th century and settled in these coastal cities. Additionally, the presence of Spanish and Portuguese outposts along the Moroccan coast between the 15th and 17th centuries likely added to this influence. This style, with local variations, is also visible in other coastal cities such as Safi and Azemmour.

== Palaces ==
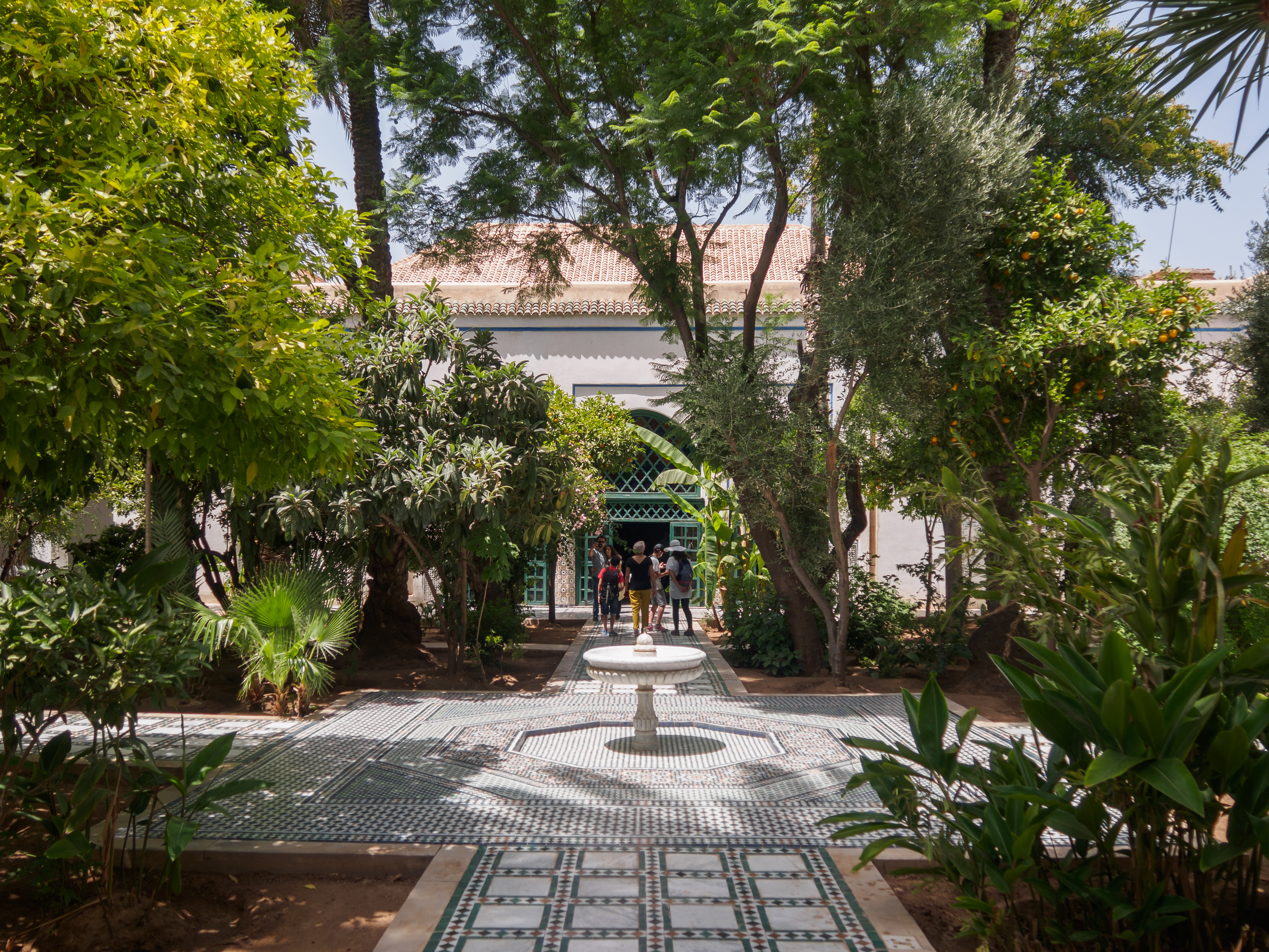
The Grand Riad in the Bahia Palace of Marrakesh (late 19th century)

Sultans and caliphs, as well as the more powerful and wealthy government ministers in the 19th and 20th century, were able to build extensive palaces. The Dar al-Makhzen (meaning roughly 'House/Abode of the Government') referred to the royal palace and center of government in a number of cities, such as the Dar al-Makhzen in Fes, Rabat, Tangier, Meknes, or Marrakesh. Royal palaces generally had a mechouar, a large walled square which acted as a ceremonial space or parade ground at the entrance of the palace. The palaces themselves had a sprawling layout, typically consisting of many structures and pavilions arranged around a series of courtyards and gardens. They often included a number of facilities such as bathhouses and mosques, thus turning them into nearly self-sufficient, self-contained royal cities. Sultans also built additional outlying palaces and pavilions, such as the Dar Batha in Fes, as well as vast gardens on the outskirts of their capital city, such as the Agdal Gardens in Marrakesh and the former Mosara Garden in Fes.

In the 19th and early 20th centuries, grand viziers and other high officials of the government were able to accumulate enough power and wealth to build their own private palaces for themselves and their households. Examples of these include the Bahia Palace of Ba Ahmed (which was later taken over by the sultan), the Dar al Bacha and Dar Si Said in Marrakesh, the Dar Moqri and Dar Glaoui in Fes, and the Dar Mnebbhi in Fes and its counterpart in Marrakesh. Other local warlords and magnates were also sometimes capable of building their own lavish palaces, such as the Palace of Raissouli in Asilah. The Kasbah of Telouet, also built by the Glaoui clan and only partly preserved today, is another notable example of a 20th-century palace constructed with traditional methods, but located in a rural mountain town.

== Recent developments and present day ==
Today, modern materials have increasingly replaced certain traditional ones during the renovations of old houses. Wooden mashrabiya-type windows have been replaced with iron grilles, and cement is used for walls and pillars instead of brick and rammed earth. The term "riad", traditionally referring to the interior garden, is nowadays applied in a broader way to traditional Moroccan houses that have been converted into hotels and tourist guesthouses.

=== Tourism ===
Riad tourism in Morocco has shaped the urban fabric of Marrakesh and other cities. According to Mauro Spotorno in 2018, the medina of Marrakesh has been cultivated since the French protectorate as a setting for Westerners that corresponds to the Orientalist stereotypes of the Muslim world, and "more and more frequently traditional houses of the historical centre have been restored and renovated into hotel facilities, and nowadays, the medina is an interesting study case of the processes of gentrification ." For Khalid Madhi, the case of tourism in Marrakesh raises questions of heritage commodification, power relations between locals and tourists, the long-term sustainability of tourism-driven urban policy, and the appropriation of land, culture, and memory. According to Nancy Nabeel Aly Demerdash, "Marrakesh is framed and famed to promise hedonistic pleasures" and "such perpetuated representational tropes actually materialize the oriental fantasy for the consumer; consequently, Marrakesh has become more of a product than place."

== See also ==
- Landmarks of Marrakesh
- Residential architecture in Historic Cairo
- Albaicín
