= Holiday cottage =

Niche in the real estate market

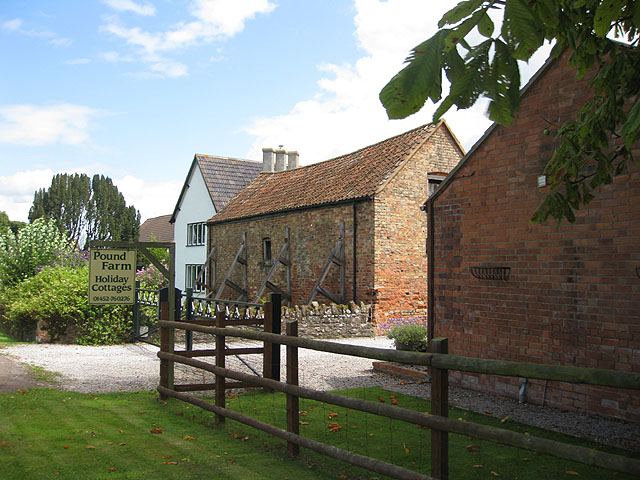
Holiday cottages in converted farm buildings, Gloucestershire, England

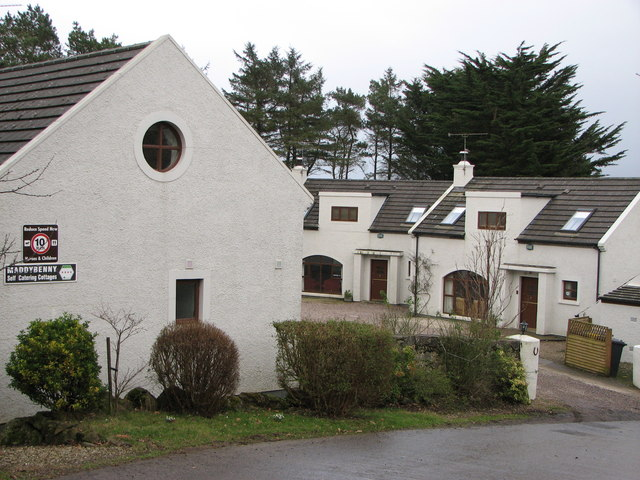
Purpose-built holiday cottages near Portrush, Northern Ireland

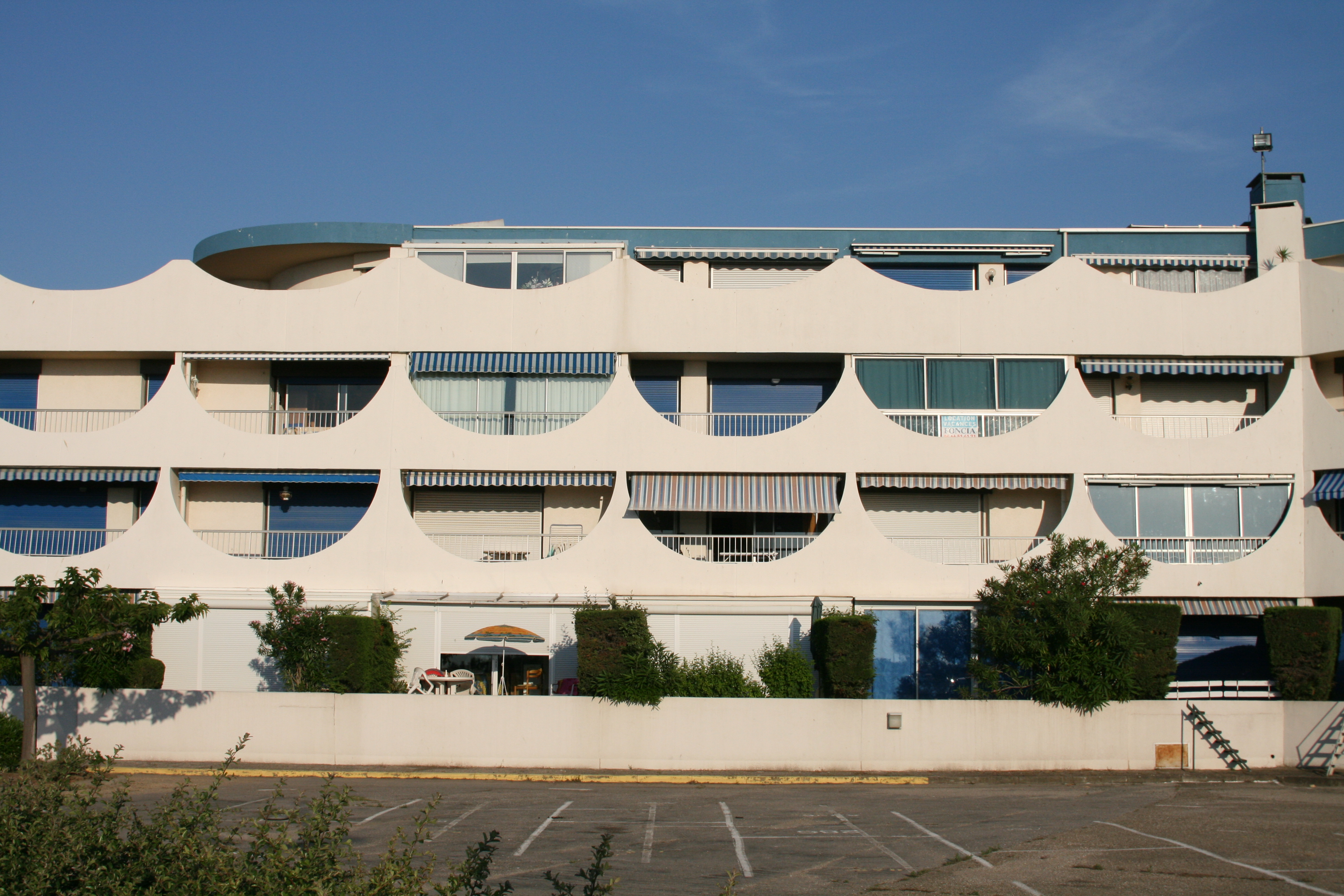
Seventies architecture in Port-Camargue, France

A holiday cottage, holiday home, vacation home, or vacation property is accommodation used for holiday vacations, corporate travel, and temporary housing often for less than 30 days. Unlike hotels, vacation homes are usually rented as private residential units and commonly include spaces such as kitchens and living areas for the occupants' use. Such properties are typically small homes, such as cottages, that travelers can rent and enjoy as if it were their own home for the duration of their stay. The properties may be owned by those using them for a vacation, in which case the term second home applies; or may be rented out to holidaymakers through an agency.

Terminology varies among countries. In the United Kingdom this type of property is usually termed a holiday home or holiday cottage; in Australia, a holiday house/home, or weekender; in New Zealand, a bach or crib.

== Characteristics and advantages ==
Today's global short-term vacation property rental market is estimated to be worth $100 billion. The holiday cottage market in both Canada and the UK is competitive.

== Numbers ==
=== United Kingdom ===
Holiday/second homes in England, 2006
Region	Number	% of homes
Cornwall and the Isles of Scilly	13,458	5.6%
Cumbria	7,906	3.4%
Dorset	10,540	3.2%
Norfolk	11,857	3.1%
Devon	14,813	3.0%
East Sussex	7,583	2.1%
Northumberland	2,805	2.0%
North Yorkshire	7,074	1.9%
West Sussex	6,266	1.8%
Suffolk	5,414	1.8%

==== Wales ====
Holiday homes and second homes make up 14% of the housing stock in Snowdonia, Wales, compared to the figure of 1% for the whole of Wales. Only in Gwynedd has the council put in place measures to control the number of holiday homes. But they only control new developments, by withholding permission where consent is likely to raise the figure in any community above 10%, they do not stop anyone from buying a holiday home. In Wales, a traditional group of holiday cottage agencies still exist as a network, and many of which still work collaboratively under Visit Wales, which used to be the Wales Tourist Board.

==== Cornwall ====
The number in Cornwall and the Isles of Scilly was calculated to be 5.6% in 2004 and 2006, this was the region which had the highest number of second homes in England. Within a year alone, between 2004 and 2005, the percentage of holiday/second homes in England increased by 3.3%.

==== Scotland ====
Holiday/second homes in Scotland, 2006
Region	% of homes
Argyll and Bute	11.1%
Eilean Siar	7.2%
Scottish Highlands	6.2%
Orkney Islands	5.3%
Shetland Islands	3.6%
Perth and Kinross	3.1%
North Ayrshire	2.4%
Dumfries and Galloway	2.3%
Scottish borders	2.3%
Moray	2.2%
Aberdeenshire	1.8%
South Ayrshire	1.5%
Stirling	1.4%
East Lothian	1.2%
Angus	1.1%
Fife	0.9%
Edinburgh	0.7%
Aberdeen	0.6%
Clackmannanshire	0.2%
Dundee	0.2%
East Ayrshire	0.2%
Falkirk	0.2%
Glasgow	0.2%
Inverclyde	0.2%
South Lanarkshire	0.2%
West Dunbartonshire	0.2%
East Dunbartonshire	0.1%
East Renfrewshire	0.1%
North Lanarkshire	0.1%
Renfrewshire	0.1%
West Lothian	0.1%

There were 29,299 holiday/summer homes in Scotland on the 2001 Scottish Census, which accounted for 1.3% of Scotland's housing stock. This figure was 19,756 in 1981, but the majority of the increase occurred during the 1990s. The greatest increase was seen in urban areas, contrary to the usual trends, and increased especially in Edinburgh and Aberdeen. But the majority of holiday/second homes are still to be found in rural areas, notably, 47% of these are to be found in the remote rural areas, where one in every eight houses is a holiday or second home.

=== France ===
The figure in France was also fairly high in 2008: approximately 10% of all the housing stock was a holiday or second home, but the majority of these were owned by French. There were approximately 300,000 homes, or 1% of the total housing stock which were the property of owners from abroad. Of this percentage 28% were owned by British owners, 14% Italian, 10% Belgian, 8% Dutch, 3% Spanish and 3% American.

=== United States ===
Holiday/second homes in north-east US, 2000
State	Number	% of homes
Maine	103,569	15.9%
Vermont	44,006	15.0%
New Hampshire	57,251	10.5%
Delaware	26,600	7.8%
Massachusetts	97,434	3.7%
New Jersey	115,439	3.5%
New York	250,199	3.3%
Rhode Island	13,624	3.1%
Pennsylvania	154,495	2.9%
Maryland	42,541	2.0%
Connecticut	25,565	1.8%
District of Columbia	2,811	1.0%
West Virginia	38,326	0.5%

In 2000, 3,578,718, or 3.1% of the American housing stock, were holiday or second homes, compared with 2.7% in 1990, and 1.9% in 1980. 26% of all these are located in the north-eastern states, with approximately 250,199 (7% of all the second homes in the U.S.) located in New York, and Maine having the largest percentage of its housing stock as second homes.

=== Canada ===
Second homes are referred to differently in different parts of the country; in Ontario it is usually 'cottage', while 'cabin' or 'the lake' is used in much of the rest of Canada. In Nova Scotia, it is also usually 'cottage' but sometimes 'camp' or, particularly if large, 'summer home' or 'summer place'. In Quebec French, a cottage or summer dwelling is often referred to as a chalet whether or not it is built in the style of a Swiss chalet or located on a ski hill; the term is used among English-speaking Quebecers as well.

"Cottage country" describes several areas in Canada. The Muskoka District in Ontario sees over 2.1 million visitors annually. Among Quebecers, the Laurentides (or "Laurentians") is an area for weekend and vacation homes. On the East Coast, the Maritimes are home to oceanfront cottages. Likewise, British Columbia on the West Coast is another vacation destination. In the Canadian Prairies and British Columbia Interior, vacation properties are located near or on freshwater lakes.

=== Ireland ===
In Ireland, holiday cottages (often referred to as self-catering cottages) form an important segment of the domestic tourism industry, particularly in rural and coastal areas. According to Fáilte Ireland, there are more than 25,000 registered self-catering units across the country, with counties Kerry, Cork, Galway and Donegal among the most popular destinations for both Irish and international visitors.

== Costs and effects ==
=== Financial and legal implications ===
In the UK, furnished holiday lettings offer other tax relief providing certain conditions are met. The current conditions are:

- It should be available for commercial letting to the public for a total of 140 days in the 12-month period.
- It must be let for at least 70 days in the 12-month period. (Where more than one qualifying property is held, it is possible to average the number of days all properties are let in total in order to meet this condition.)
- The total periods of long term occupation may not exceed 155 days during the 12-month period.

Second home and holiday home owners used to be able to claim discounts in their council tax in the United Kingdom, as the property is vacant for much of the year. This is no longer true in many areas, including Carmarthenshire; if the property is empty (but furnished) no discount is permitted and the owner will be liable to pay the tax in full. Cornwall had a 50% council tax discount which was lowered to 10% in 2004. As of 2006, many second home owners were still able to claim 50%, in other areas in England.

The Welsh movement, Cymuned, promote the principle that owners of holiday homes should pay double the standard rate of council tax, as they do not otherwise invest in the local community. Testimony of this is to be seen in a report on the effect of holiday homes in Scotland, which found that those who went on holiday to Scotland spent an average of £57 a day, in comparison to just £32 a day spent by those visiting their holiday or second homes.

=== Community ===
Owners of holiday homes will occasionally move to their second homes permanently upon retirement, this can be a threat to the culture of an area, especially in Wales where the influx of non-Welsh speakers affects the percentage of Welsh speakers in the area and reduces the use of Welsh in everyday life. Hundreds of second homes were burnt between 1979 and the mid-1990s as part of a campaign by nationalist movement Meibion Glyndŵr to protect the indigenous language and culture.

== See also ==
- A-frame house
- Apartment
- Beach house
- Cottage
- Dacha
- Log cabin
- Mar del Plata style
- Moroccan riad
- Pied-à-terre
- Summer house
- Vacation home deductions
- Vacation rental
- Villa holiday
