= Mouassine =

Neighbourhood in Marrakesh, Morocco

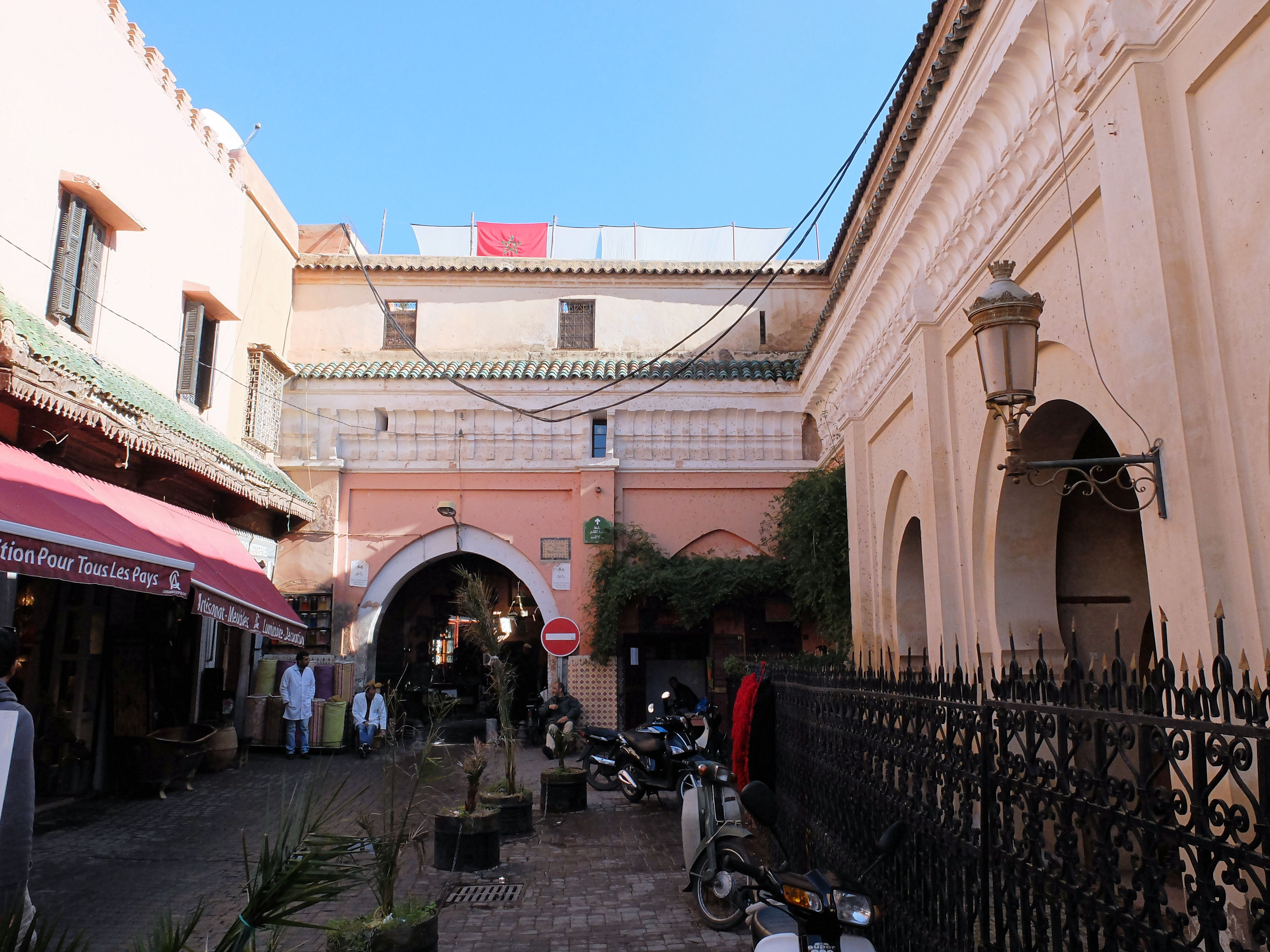
The small public square in front of the Mouassine Mosque and fountain.

Mouassine is a district within the Medina of Marrakech neighbouring the districts of Bab Doukkala, Azbezt, Derb Tizougarine and Riad Aitoun El Kedim. The area contains the Mouassine Mosque, the Mouassine Fountain (part of the mosque complex), and the Dar el Bacha Palace.

The area acts as one of the main gateways to the souks in the medina (old city).

== Name ==
The etymology of the name "Mouassine" (or muwāssīn) is uncertain. Historian Gaston Deverdun noted that the name was popularly attributed to a Sharifian family which supposedly lived in the district, which also explained why the mosque is also known by the name Jami' al-Ashraf ("Mosque of the Sharifs"). However, historians have not been able to establish a record of such a family in the area. Deverdun notes that another possibility is that the name derives from an Arabic word meaning "knife-makers" or "cutlers", denoting the former presence of craftsmen along the main street of the area when the Jewish community was established there. Scholar Iñigo Almela likewise cites this as the most plausible etymology, but notes that this is still debatable.

== History ==
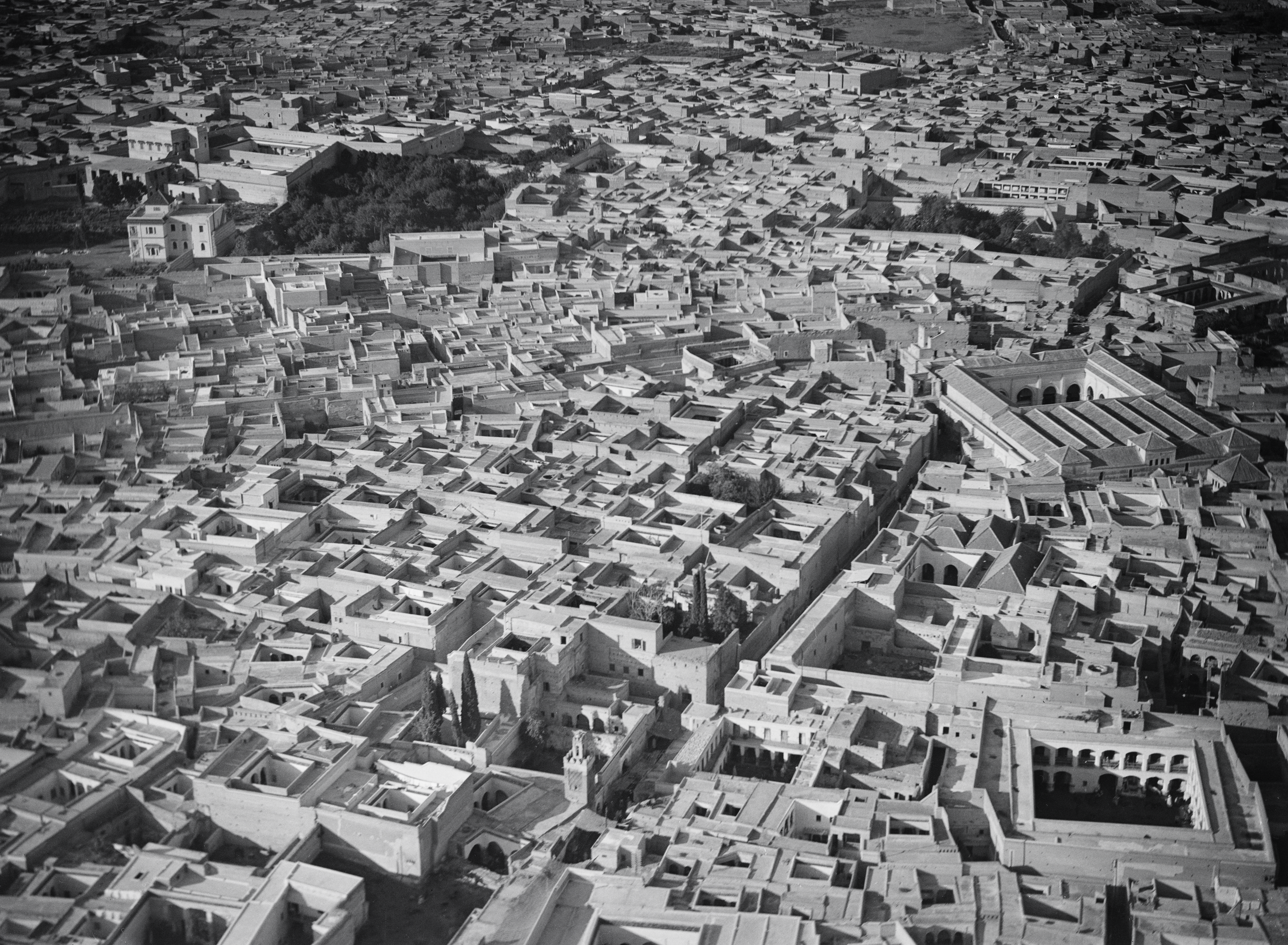
Aerial view of the Mouassine neighbourhood in the early 20th century. The Mouassine Mosque is visible in the middle right.

Up until the reign of Abdellah El Ghalib Jews were relatively dispersed through the city but the area of Mouassine housed a significant concentration of them and was generally regarded as an ancient Jewish quarter. When Abdallah El Ghalib came to power in 1557 he used the opportunity to re-landscape Marrakech as a symbol of his authority and part of this was to relocate the Jewish community into the new Mellah area. Up until this massive re-landscaping Mouassine was regarded as one of the two ancient Jewish areas. The most famous landmark in Mouassine is the Mouassine Mosque commissioned by Sultan Abdellah. The construction of the mosque was part of a major redevelopment of the area and was located upon the site of a former Jewish cemetery. The mosque, also known as Jami' al-Ashraf, is part of a larger complex that includes a library, hamman, madrasa and the famous Mouassine Fountain, one of the most famous in the medina.

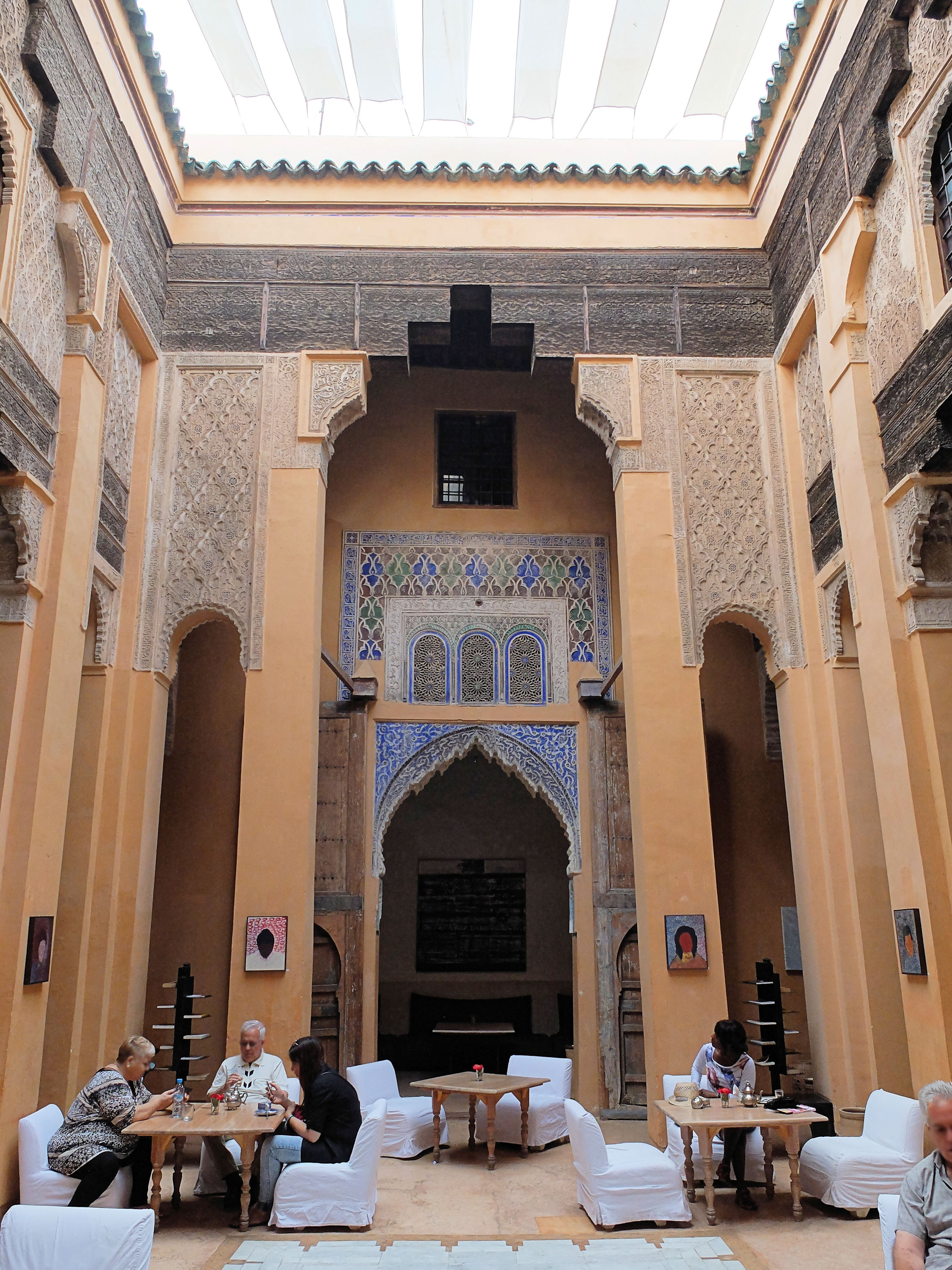
Dar Cherifa, a restored Saadian-era house in the Mouassine neighbourhood

The current configuration of Mouassine thus dates back to the Saadian period, and its redevelopment at this time enticed a relatively large number of bourgeois or aristocratic families to build their residences here. This has resulted in a concentration of structures dating from the Saadian period located in this area, with examples of Saadian-era houses including the Dar Cherifa (formerly Dar Ijimi), the Dar al-Mas'udiyyin, and the Dar al-Masluhiyyin (known also as Ksour Agafay). Some of these houses today have been converted into cafés, restaurants, and hotels. Also notable is the douiria (an upper-floor apartment for receiving guests) in what is now the Mouassine Museum. This house, recently restored to reveal its original wood and stucco ornamentation, dates back to the Saadian period but also features decorative motifs from the time of Sultan Moulay Ismail (1672–1727).

== Economy ==
A number of rooftop cafés and boutique hotels are located here to serve the tourism industry. Several of the old city's major souq streets are also located here or can be accessed from this area.
