= Manduva Logili =

Courtyard house in Andhra Pradesh, India, suitable for extended family to live in

In Andhra Pradesh, India, a Manduva Logili or (logili) is a kind of courtyard house suitable for extended family (joint family) to live in. Manduva Logili houses built in olden days before the 1950s and 1960s are still found in rural villages of East Godavari, West Godavari, Guntur, Nellore, Vizianagaram, and Kadapa districts.

== Construction ==
The walls of Manduva Logili houses are constructed with gummy soils or red bricks and the roofs are supported by logs of rosewood (Dalbergia Latifolia) or teak wood. Top of the roof are covered with red tiles. The inside of a typical Manduva Logili will have a common hall with several spacious rooms spanning in all four directions. The roof of the house is supported by several giant wooden pillars. The center of the common hall is usually topless to let the air and light come in. A pit is constructed on the floor just below the open top, so that rain water fall into the pit, and from there it goes out of the house through drain. Some Manduva houses will not have open top, instead it is closed, and a pipe is fixed just above. The rain water from the top falls into a small constructed pit through the pipe.

== Maintenance ==
Manduva Logili houses are often prone to attacks of termites (white ants). Its maintenance is very expensive. Today it is almost impossible to get huge wooden logs in the market, due to tightening of laws related to forestry.

== Existence status ==
These kind of house constructions are under extinction because of urbanization, western culture influence and downfall of traditional joint family system.
