= Mouassine Museum =

Museum and historic house in Marrakesh, Morocco

Coordinates: 31°37′45.5″N 7°58′19.8″W

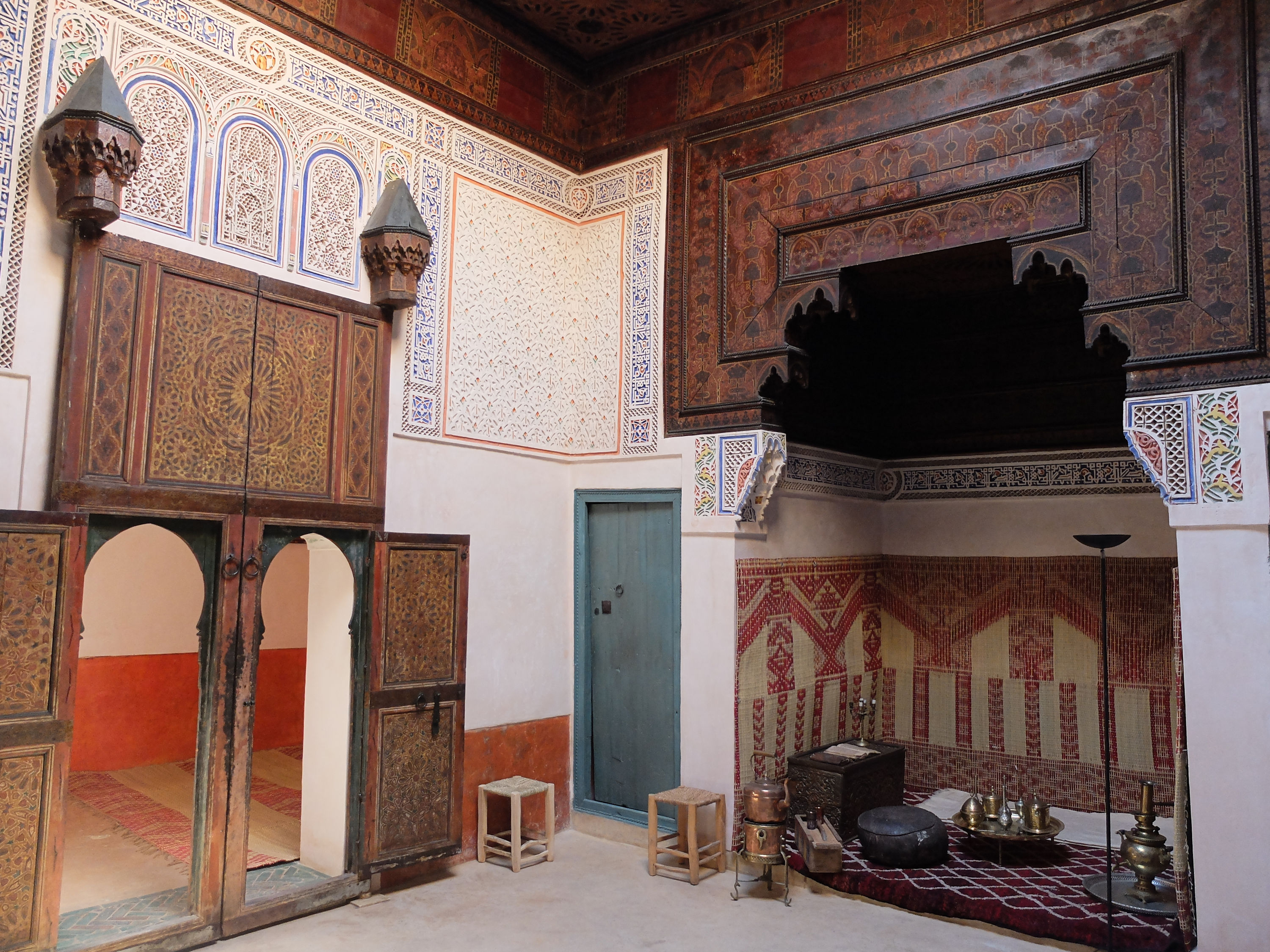
The main salon of the restored douiria in the museum

The Mouassine Museum (French: Musée de Mouassine; Arabic: متحف المواسين) is a museum in the Mouassine neighbourhood of the historic medina of Marrakesh, Morocco. The museum is housed in a recently restored 16th to 17th-century house which includes an upper-floor apartment known as a douiria (or dwiriya). It was recently converted to a Museum of Music, with permanent and temporary exhibits.

== History ==
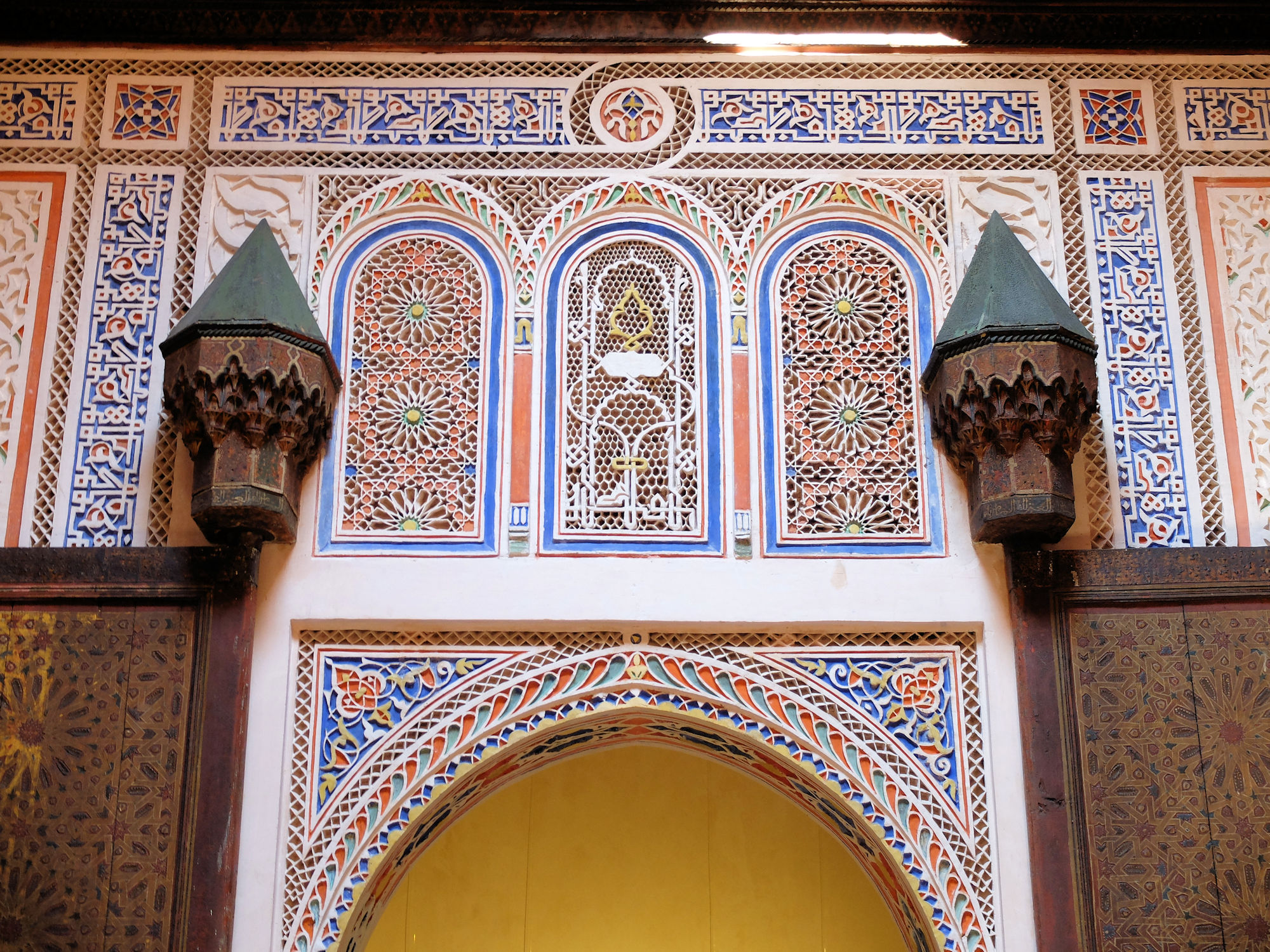
Stucco decoration in the main salon

The house is located in the Mouassine district, which was the subject of significant development in the Saadian period (16th and early 17th century). In the 1560s Sultan Moulay Abdallah al-Ghalib ordered the relocation of the Jewish community, which until then had occupied this district, to a new Mellah district next to the Kasbah of the city. This liberated new land which was subsequently redeveloped into new "model" neighbourhoods centered around the newly constructed Mouassine Mosque and religious complex (as well as the Bab Doukkala Mosque complex further west). This enticed a relatively large number of bourgeois or aristocratic families to build their residences here, resulting in a concentration of structures dating from the Saadian period in this area. Examples of such Saadian-era houses include the Dar Cherifa (formerly Dar Ijimi), the Dar al-Mas'udiyyin, and the Dar al-Masluhiyyin (known also as Ksour Agafay). (Some of these houses today have been converted into cafés, restaurants, and hotels.)

The building which the Mouassine Museum occupies today is located right next to the southeastern corner of the Mouassine Mosque, along Derb el Hammam street (named after the bathhouse of the mosque). It consists of a residential home which includes a douiria (or dwiriya), a small house or upper floor apartment which was used to receive guests, often integrated to a larger riad or mansion. It was built by an aristocratic Sharifian family in the 1560s, at the time when this neighbourhood was being created by the Saadians. Some of the painted sun motifs in the house, however, appear to date from the reign of the later Alaouite sultan Moulay Isma'il in the late 17th or early 18th century.

In recent times, the house was inhabited by the local Mellakh family (which included the painter Abdelhay Mellakh) since at least 1954 before being bought in 2012 by Patrick Manac’h and Hamid Mergani, co-founders of another museum in the city, the Maison de la Photographie ("House of Photography"). Although some of the old wooden doors and ceilings were visible, Manac'h suspected that the original walls of the house might be hidden beneath the recent layers of plaster, and recruited the help of Xavier Salmon, a curator at the Louvre Museum, to investigate. They conducted tests and discovered that under the thick layers of modern white plaster was the original pinkish gypsum-based stucco of the historic douiria. With the help of Salmon and other experts, a team of craftsmen were recruited to carefully remove the modern plaster and painstakingly restore the original decoration. Even some of the original colours had been preserved; an uncommon case for Saadian-era buildings. The historic house was opened as a museum and cultural venue in 2014 and in 2019 it also became a museum of Moroccan music, in addition to hosting regular musical performances.

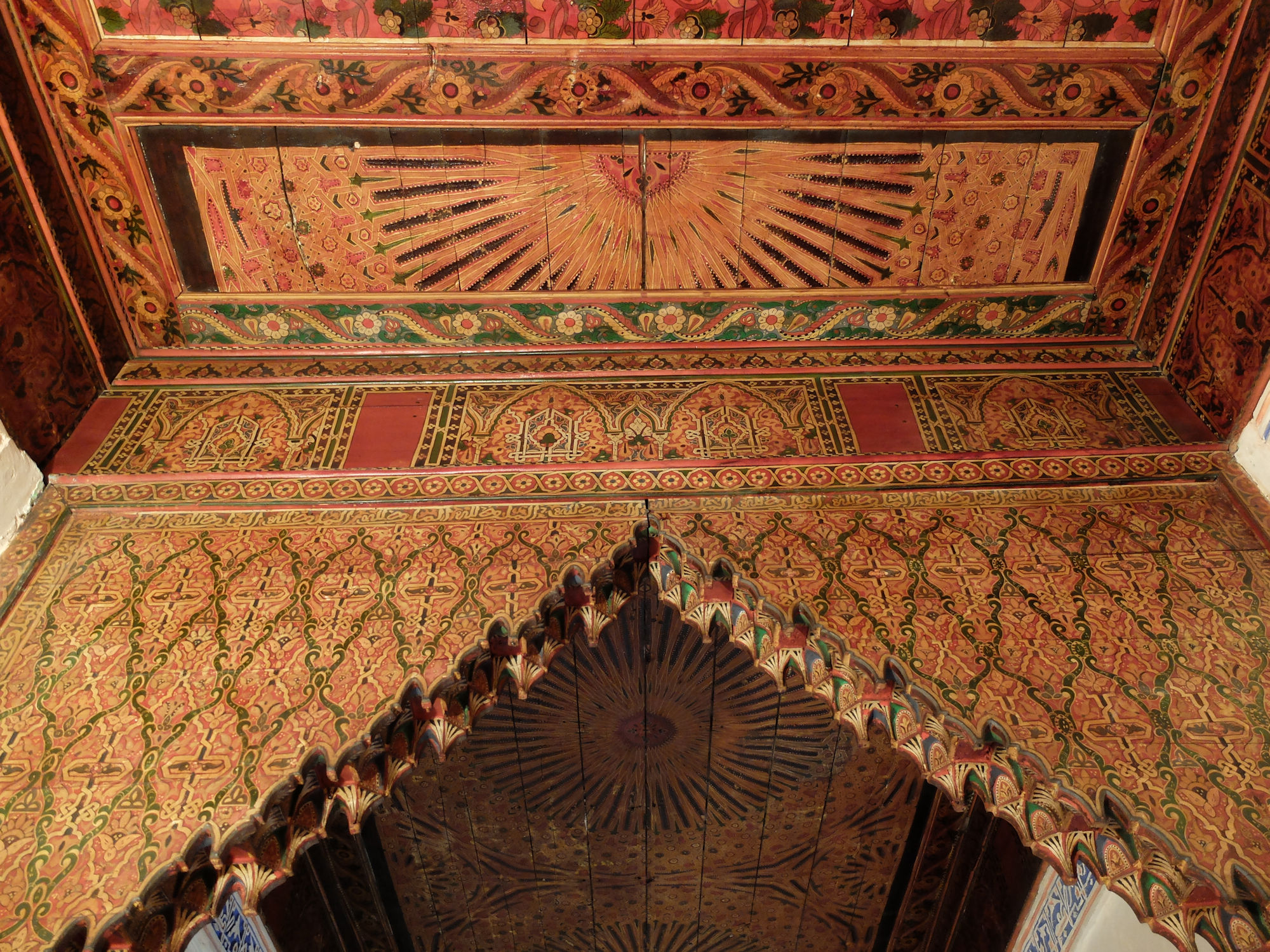
Painted wood ceilings in one of the side rooms

== Architecture ==
The douiria or apartment is located on the upper floor of the house and is reached via a short staircase. This leads to a square salon covered by a wooden ceiling with a central skylight. On two sides of the salon, facing each other, are large alcoves which served as seating areas and are sheltered by their own wooden canopies or ceilings. The two other sides of the salon have large doorways leading to side rooms which might have been used as bedrooms or secondary salons. The main central room is particularly rich in decoration, with carved stucco featuring geometric patterns and Kufic letter motifs as well as sculpted and painted wooden ceilings. The side rooms also have painted ceilings, featuring motifs from the time of Sultan Moulay Ismail (late 17th to early 18th century).
