= Vacation home deductions =

Tax deduction

In the United States federal income tax, a Vacation home deduction is a tax deduction to be claimed on an individual taxpayer's vacation home.

This deduction is limited under the law. Generally, a taxpayer may not deduct expenses related to a vacation home since the owner uses the property for personal enjoyment. However, a taxpayer may claim limited deductions on a vacation home if the taxpayer uses the property as both a vacation home and rental property.

If the taxpayer uses the property for greater than 14 days or 10% of the number of days the property is rented, the taxpayer may deduct some of the property-related expenses. These deductions are limited to the gross income from the rent less the general expenses attributable to the rental use of the property. The taxpayer may deduct the expenses related to the property limited to (i) the number of days the property was rented at fair market rental value over (ii) the total number of days the property was used.

If the taxpayer rents the property for less than 15 days, the taxpayer may not deduct any property-related expenses. However, in this case, the taxpayer does not have to include as income any rent attributable to the property.
