= Courtyard house =

Style of building

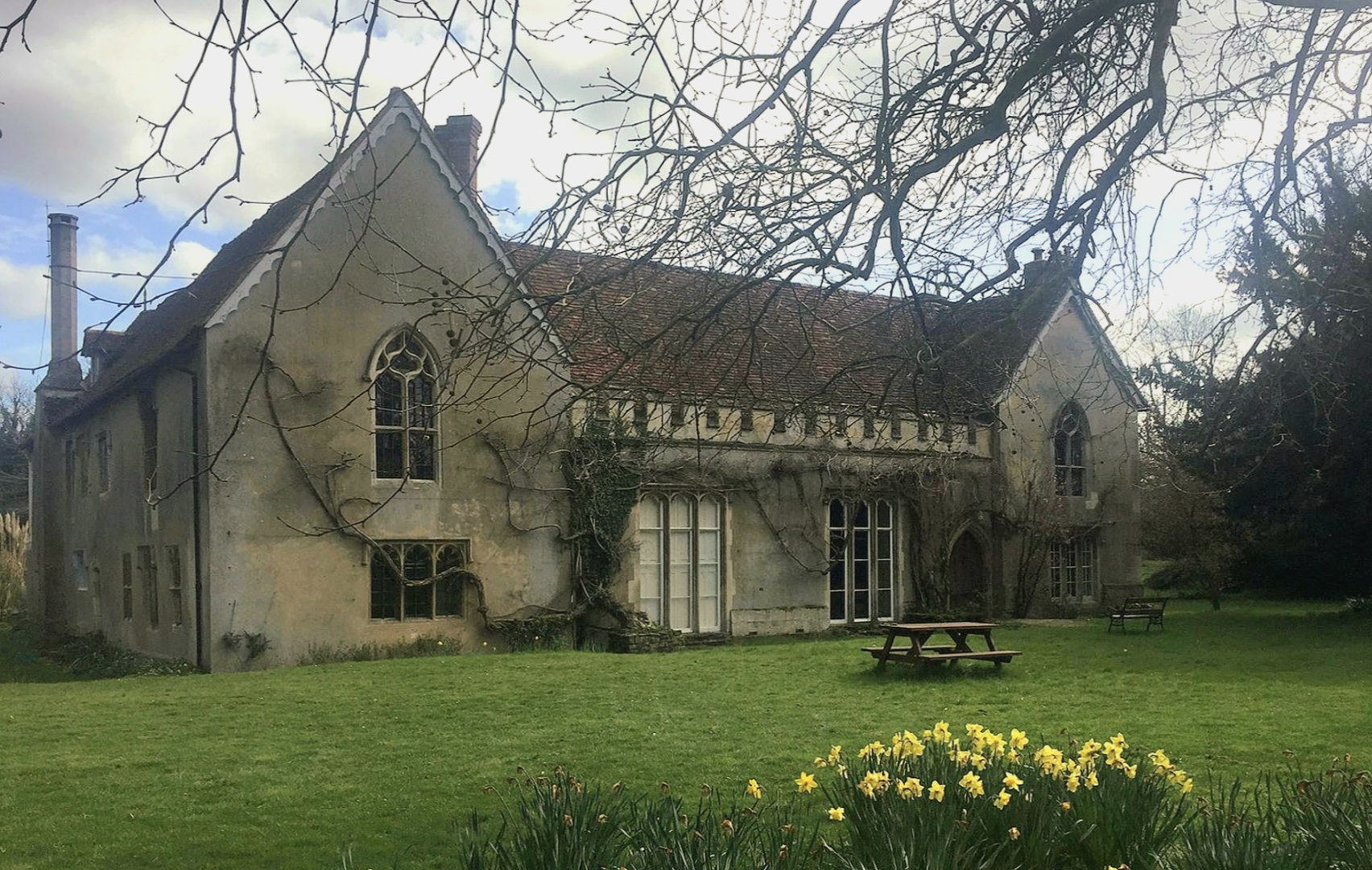
"The Abbey", Sutton Courtenay, a typical example of an English medieval courtyard house

A courtyard house is a type of house—often a large house—where the main part of the building is disposed around a central courtyard. Many houses that have courtyards are not courtyard houses of the type covered by this article. For example, large houses often have small courtyards surrounded by service rooms or corridors, but the main rooms are not disposed around a courtyard. Blenheim Palace in England is an example of such a house.

The main rooms of a courtyard house often open onto the courtyard, and the exterior walls may be windowless and/or semi-fortified and/or surrounded by a moat. Courtyard houses of this type occupy an intermediate position between a castle or fortress, where defence is the primary design consideration, and more modern plans in which defence is not a consideration at all. In England the courtyard house was a popular design for large houses in the sixteenth century, after noblemen had stopped building themselves castles, but before thoughts of defence were altogether forgotten in the planning of country houses.

== History ==
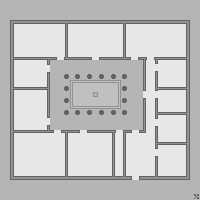
Plan of a Roman courtyard house

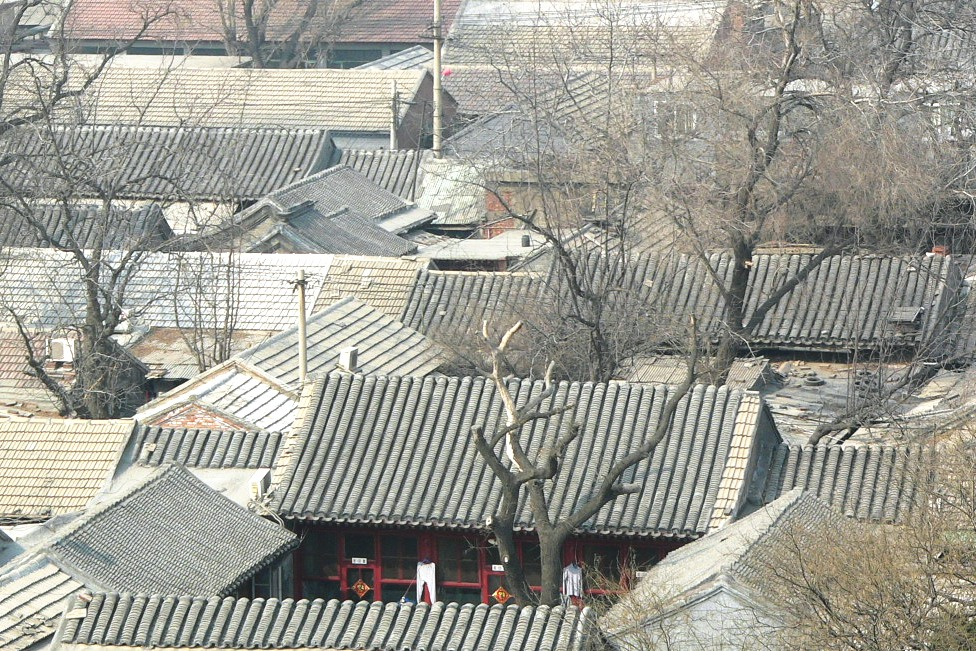
Courtyard houses in Beijing

The courtyard house makes its first appearance in Mesopotamian sites such as Tell Chuera in present-day Syria ca. 6500 BC, and in the central Jordan Valley on the northern bank of the Yarmouk River, ca. 6400–6000 BC (calibrated), in the Neolithic Yarmukian site at Sha'ar HaGolan, giving the site a special significance in architectural history. The houses consist of a central courtyard surrounded by several small rooms. They range between 250 and 700 m^{2} (about 2,700 and 7,500 ft^{2}) in area. Monumental construction on this scale is unknown elsewhere during this period.

In Ancient Roman architecture courtyard houses were built around an atrium. Courtyard houses are also common in Islamic architecture.

Courtyard houses consisting of multiple separate residences have been built in many regions and eras, including the earliest Chinese dynasties and the Inca period. Throughout history the courtyard house has played a major role, and only in the last couple of centuries has its use been neglected. Recently, more attention has been given to the courtyard house, as a type to solve a number of problems of dense inner city housing.

Courtyard houses are also a form of dwelling built in the British Isles late in the Iron Age. They are restricted to the granite peninsula of Land's End and the Isles of Scilly, Wales and other highland areas. Examples are at Chysauster and Carn Euny in Cornwall.

Another type of courtyard house was built by the landowners in England in the late Middle Ages and the Tudor period. These were single family homes that were larger than the manor houses built by the lesser gentry in earlier centuries and less fortified than the castles built by magnates in earlier centuries. Examples include in the late Tudor and early Stuart period a transition occurred to more compactly planned and symmetrical layouts. This change is illustrated by the contrast between Hatfield House and the earlier Hatfield Palace, which it was built to replace.

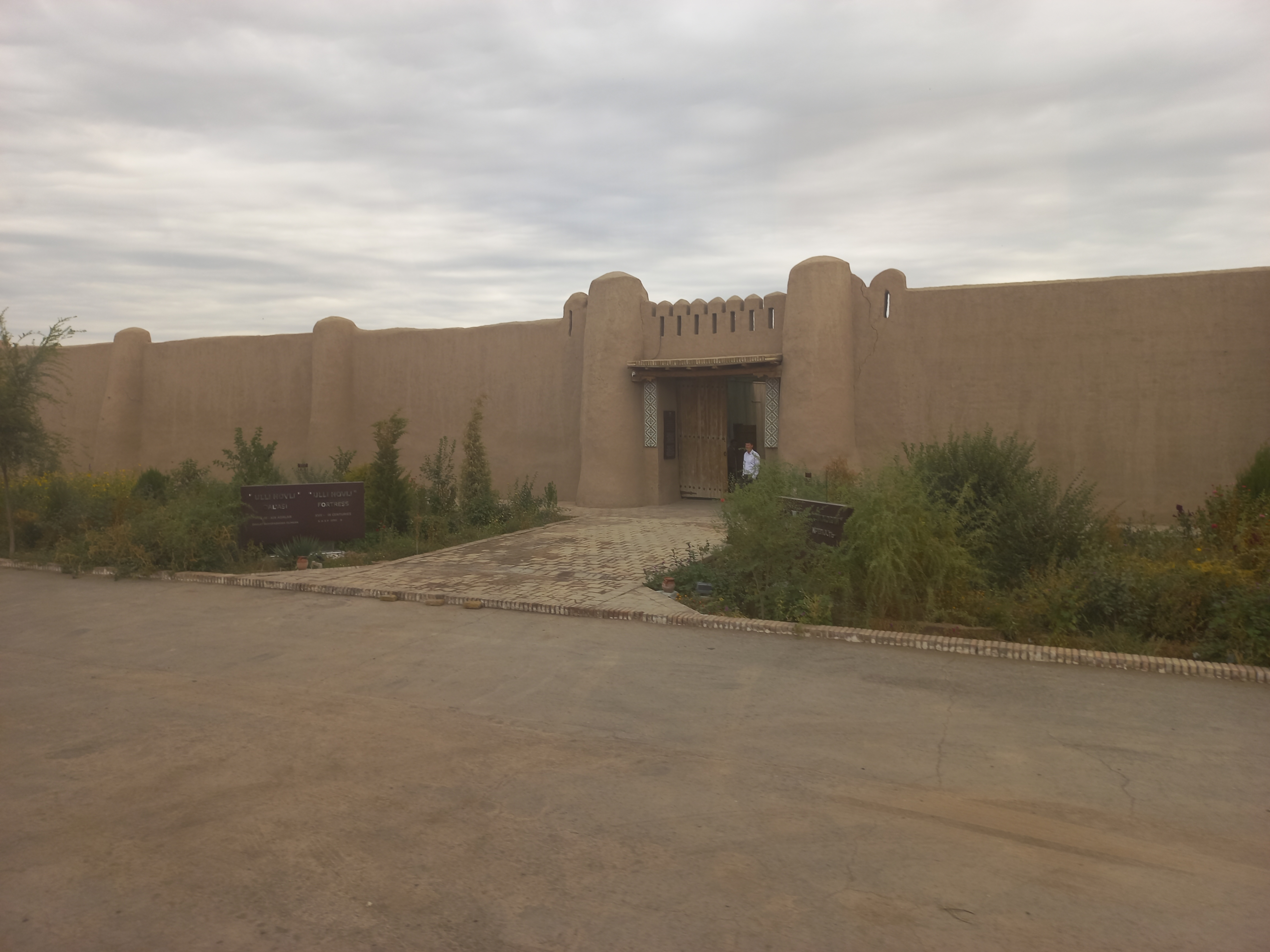
Entrance gate of the Ulli Hovli ("great hovli") complex in Urgench, Uzbekistan

Traditional courtyard houses found in the old towns of Uzbekistan's cities are known as hovli. They consist of living rooms built into four tall brick walls, surrounding a courtyard filled with fruit trees, vegetables, herbs and flowers. In the centre of the courtyard, a raised metal platform with a table on top of it, known as a karavot or so'ri, is used for conversation and eating. The walled-in rooms and courtyard are separated from the outside street by a gate built into the walls.

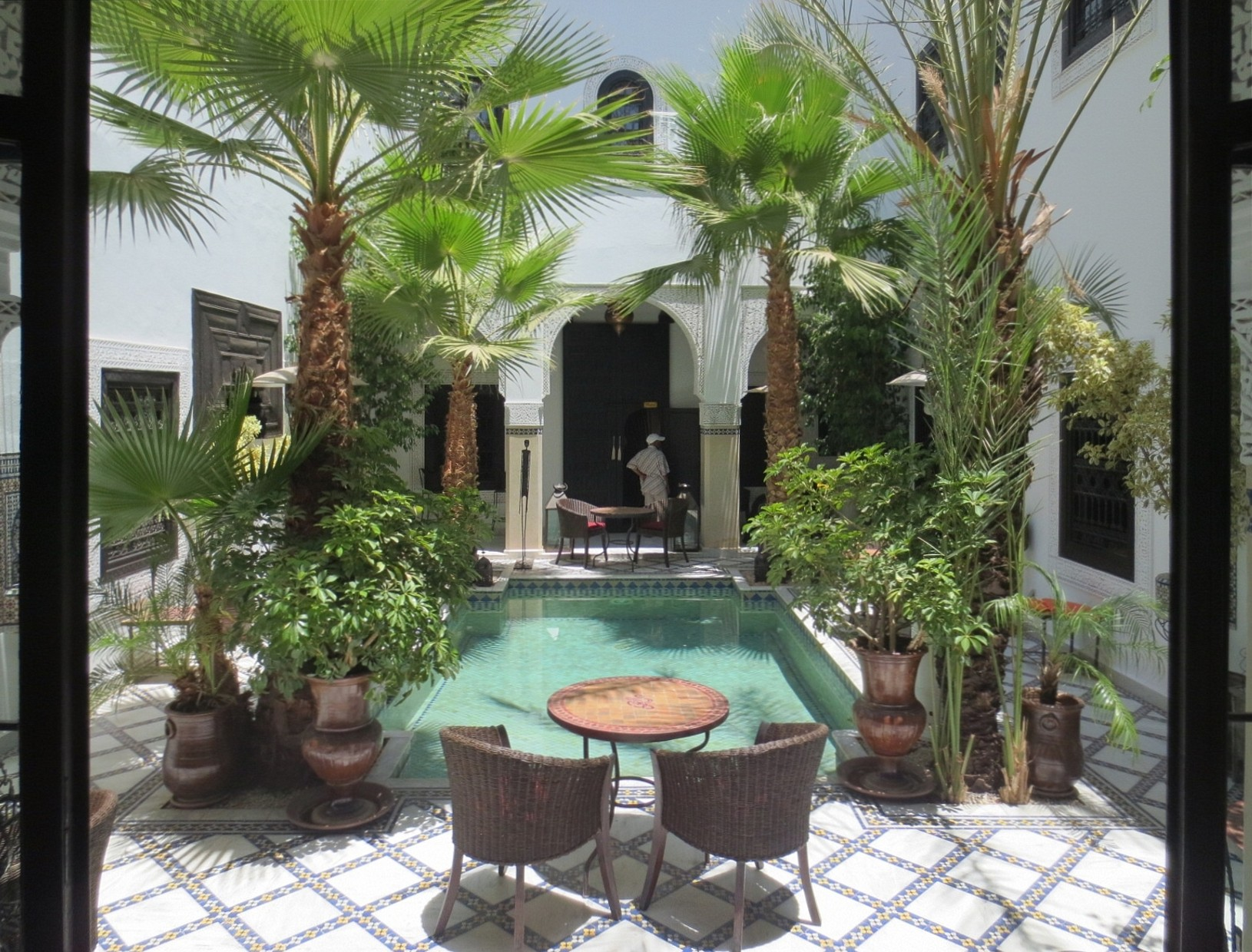
The central courtyard of a refurbished riad in Marrakesh

In the old towns of Morocco, known as medinas, courtyard houses have always been the standard form of housing. The traditional houses are called riads, riad being the name of interior gardens in Moorish architecture. Once neglected, Moroccan riads have experienced lately a real comeback with the tourism boom the country has been experiencing since the early 2000s. Many of these houses have been turned into guest houses, especially in cities likes Marrakesh, Essaouira, Fez and Tangier.

In rural villages of India, such as Andhra Pradesh these Courtyard houses are termed as Manduva Logili Illulu, and in Kerala they are called as Nalukettu. Courtyard houses built in ancient India are based upon vastu shastra, propounded in mythology by Maya Danava. With the resurgent economy in India, many new houses are being built according to the principles of vastu shastra.

== See also ==
- Siheyuan: a style of Chinese courtyard house in Beijing
- Riad: traditional courtyard houses in Morocco
