= Riad (architecture) =

Type of interior garden or house

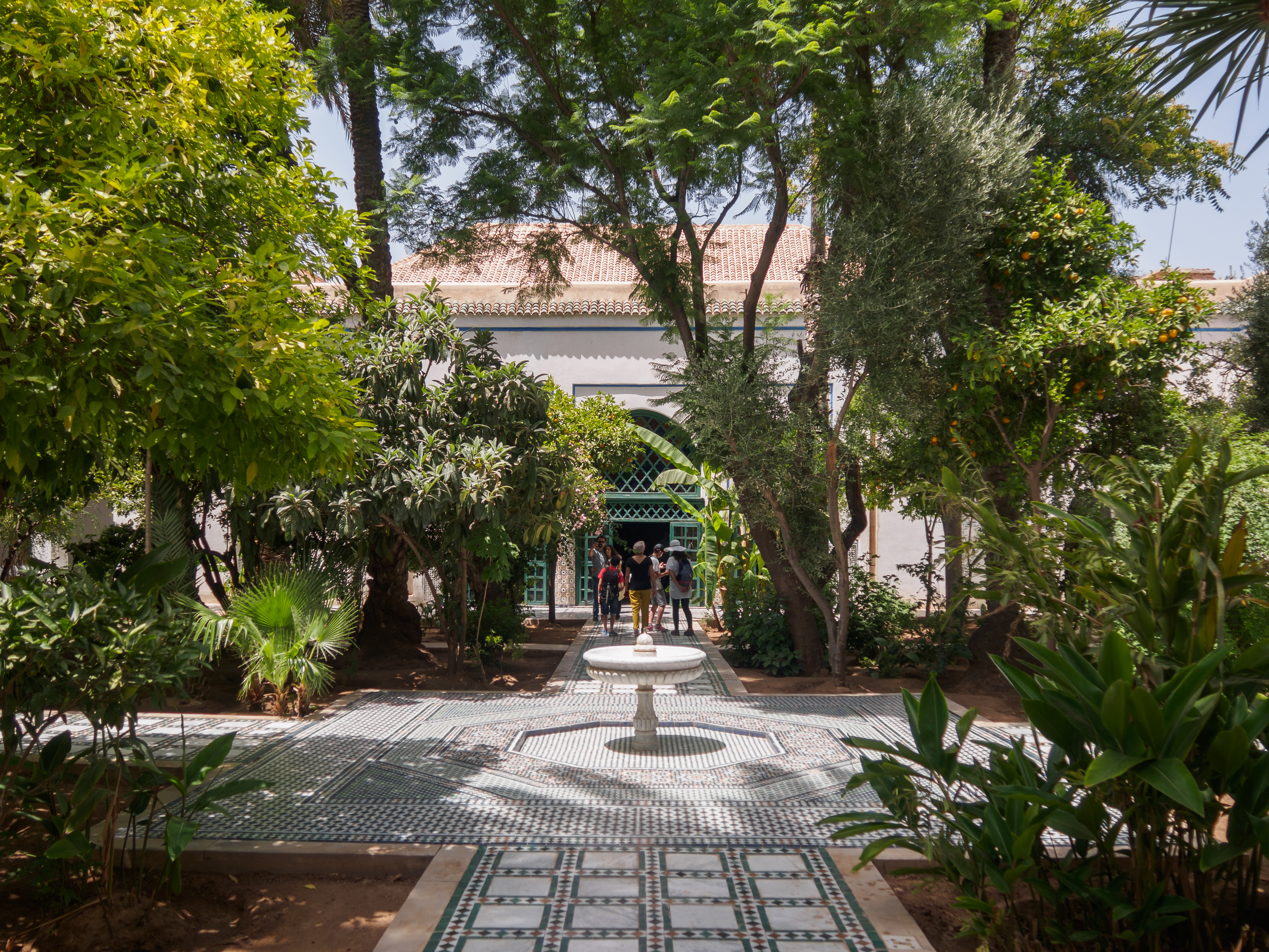
A riad garden in the Bahia Palace of Marrakesh, built in the late 19th and early 20th centuries

A riad or riyad (Arabic: رياض, romanized: riyāḍ, lit. 'gardens') is a type of garden courtyard historically associated with house and palace architecture in the Maghreb and al-Andalus. Its classic form is a rectangular garden divided into four quadrants by two paved paths intersecting in the center, where a fountain is typically situated. The planted areas are usually sunken below the level of the paths. Its origin is generally attributed to traditional Persian gardens whose influence spread during the Islamic period. The term "riad" is nowadays often used in Morocco to refer to a hotel or guesthouse-style accommodation with shared common areas and private rooms, often within a restored traditional mansion.

== Etymology ==
The term riad comes from the Arabic term for "gardens": رياض (riyāḍ), the plural of روضة (rawḍa). Historically, the term referred to a type of interior garden common to historic Moorish architecture in Al-Andalus (Iberian Peninsula) and North Africa. In particular, it denoted a charbagh, a rectangular courtyard garden symmetrically divided into four parts along its central axes, typically with a fountain at its middle.

== History ==
Riad architecture ultimately has ancient roots in Mediterranean and Middle Eastern domestic architecture. Houses centered around inner courtyards existed across the ancient Greco-Roman world and, before that, in the ancient Middle East. Interior gardens are also an ancient feature of domestic architecture in the Middle East, and the geometrically arranged gardens of Islamic architecture derive from Iranian civilization in particular. Archaeological remains of similar gardens have been found in and around ancient Mesopotamia, and the later evolution of such gardens can be found in the grand geometrically-arranged gardens of Iranian and Mughal architecture, known as a chahar bagh. In addition to the existing influences of Greco-Roman culture in the Mediterranean, the formation of the Islamic world after the 7th century also spread and established these architectural models across the region and all the way to al-Andalus in the Iberian Peninsula. Interior gardens were a popular feature of palace architecture in the Islamic world because water and greenery were associated with images of paradise in Islam.

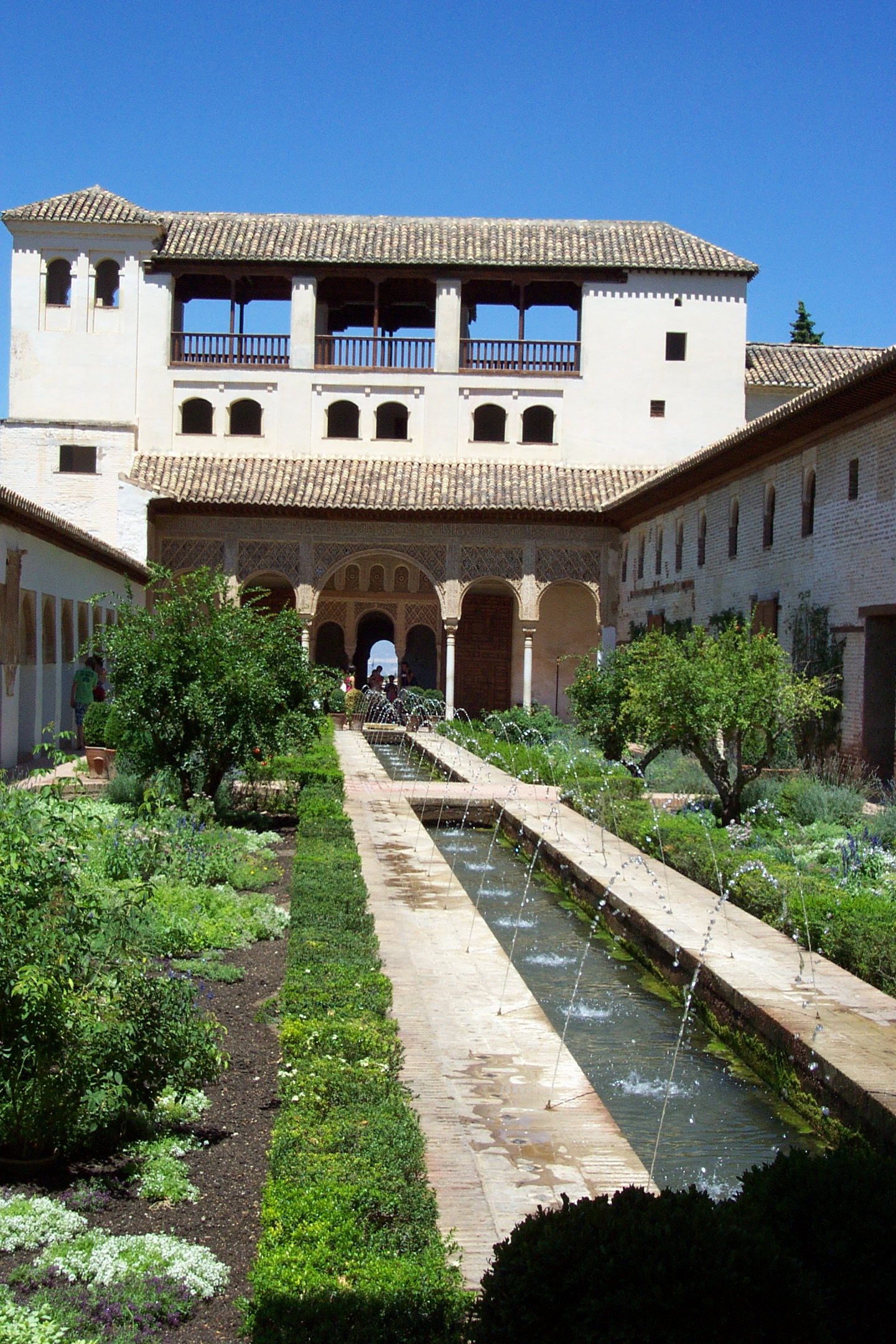
Interior garden in the Generalife of the Alhambra, in Granada, a variation of the riad element in Muslim palace architecture of the region

Scholars generally attribute the origins of riad gardens in the western Islamic world to its antecedents in the eastern Persian world. Important examples of riads, or riad-like gardens, in al-Andalus are found at Madinat al-Zahra (10th century), the Aljaferia (11th century), the Castillejo of Monteagudo (near Murcia, 12th century) and the Alhambra (13th-15th centuries). However, it is unclear to what extent Moroccan riads and houses were inspired by models imported by immigrants from al-Andalus or to what extent they developed locally in parallel with Andalusi versions. What is certain, however, is that there was historically a close cultural and geopolitical relationship between the two lands on either side of the Strait of Gibraltar.

When the Almoravids (who were based in Morocco) conquered al-Andalus in the 11th century they commissioned Muslim, Christian and Jewish artisans from al-Andalus to work on monuments in Morocco and throughout their empire, further contributing to a shared architectural and artistic heritage between al-Andalus and North Africa. The earliest known example of a true riad garden (with a symmetrical four-part division) in Morocco was found in the Almoravid palace built by Ali ibn Yusuf in Marrakesh in the early 12th century, which was part of the older Ksar al-Hajjar fortress. The era of the Almoravids and their successor dynasties (such as the Almohads, the Marinids, and the Nasrids) was a formative period of Moroccan architecture and of wider Moorish architecture during which the model of the riad garden was perfected and established as a standard feature of interior secular or palace architecture in the region. It was particularly successful and common in Marrakesh, where the combination of climate and available space made it well-suited to the architecture of the bourgeois mansions and royal palaces built in the city.

Although little remains of the Hafsid-era palaces in Tunisia, a contemporary description of the Ras al-Tabya palace – near the present-day Bardo in Tunis – from the second half of the 15th century indicates that it had a large cruciform garden with a central fountain, four water features and four pavilions arranged in cross-formation, thus similar to riad palaces elsewhere, including the later Badi Palace in Marrakesh. In Tlemcen, Algeria, the Zayyanid-era Mechouar Palace was described as featuring enclosed gardens, although nothing of these has survived to the present day.

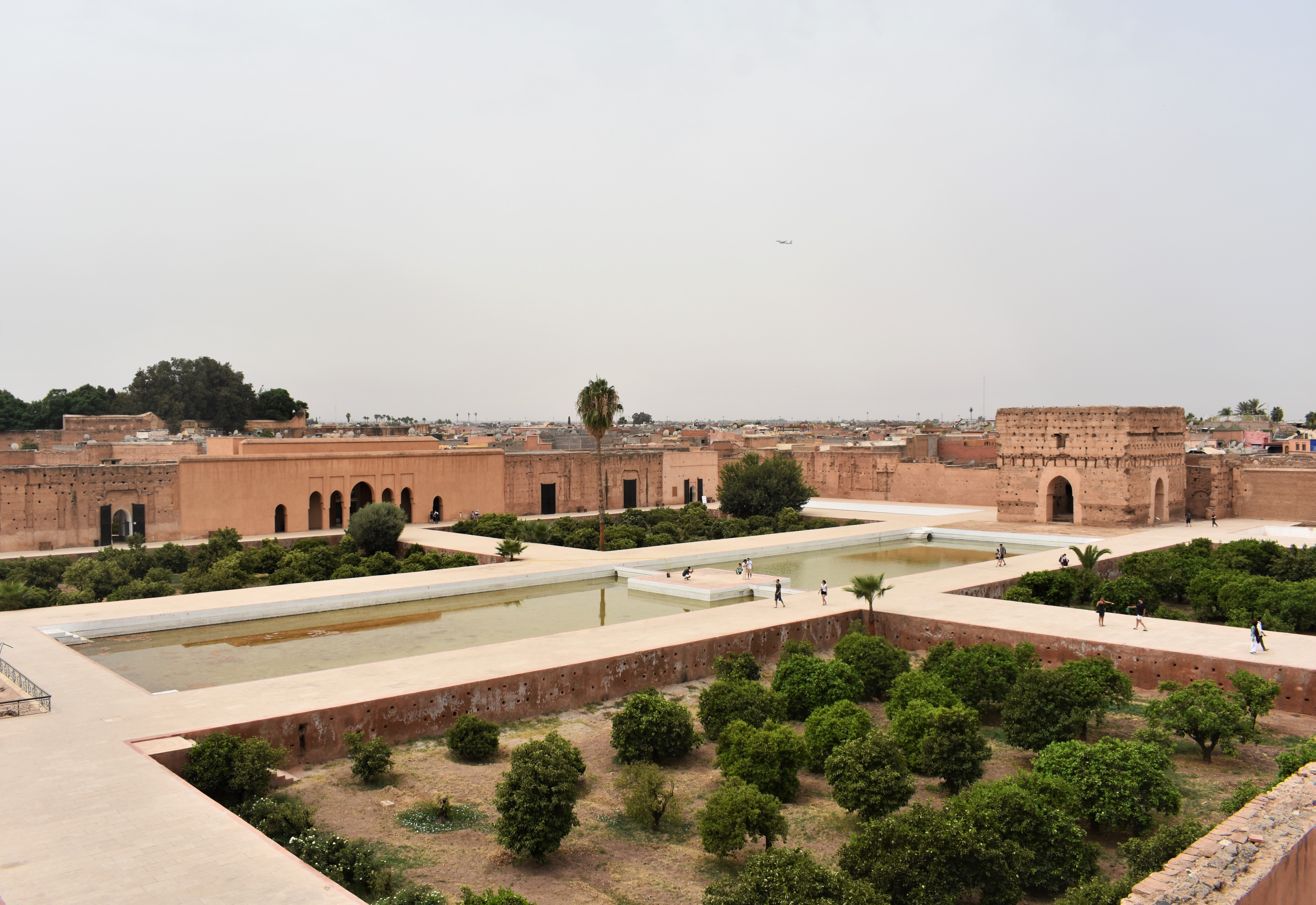
The Badi Palace in Marrakesh, a riad-style palace on a grand scale, built in the late 16th century by Saadian sultan Ahmad al-Mansur

Riad gardens were major elements of later Moroccan royal palaces, although sometimes in a form slightly different or more complex than the classic four-part division. The Badi Palace in Marrakesh, a lavish reception palace built by the Saadian sultan Ahmad al-Mansur in the late 16th century, was essentially a giant rectangular riad courtyard, with symmetrical gardens, pools, and two monumental pavilions facing each other at either end. (The presence of two pavilions in this manner was also reminiscent of the layout of the much smaller Court of the Lions in the Alhambra.) The Saadian palace built by al-Mansur in the Agdal Gardens, replaced by modern structures today, also had a symmetrical riad-style courtyard layout. The largest riad garden in Marrakesh today is the Arsat an-Nil ("Garden of the Nile") located in the Royal Palace and dating from the reign of the Alaouite sultan Muhammad Ibn Abdallah (1757–1790). Measuring around 130 meters on its north–south axis and 70 meters on its east–west axis, it is divided along its middle by a path from north to south which in turn is intersected by several other perpendicular paths, forming a vast, elongated version of a riad. Riads became more common in Fes only in recent centuries, as the existing architectural fabric and the sloped landscape of the city lent themselves less easily to large gardens. The late 19th-century Dar Batha palace (now a museum) in Fes is a large and clear example of a classic riad.

== In Moroccan domestic architecture ==
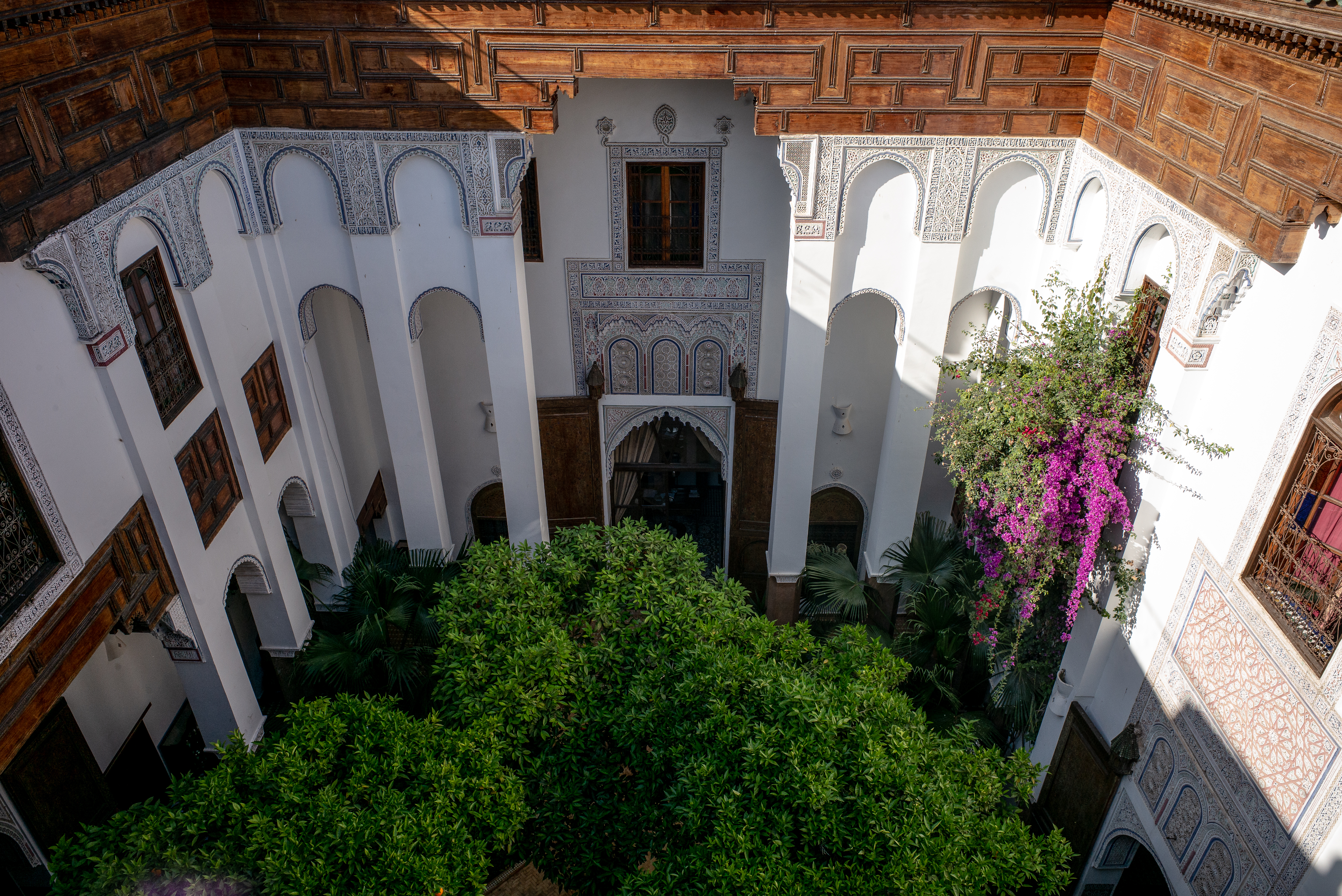
A restored house in riad-style in Fez

The riad is one of two main types of traditional Moroccan houses, often with two or more stories around an interior symmetrical garden centered around a fountain. Riads were the stately city homes of the wealthiest citizens such as merchants and courtiers who were able to build mansions which included interior gardens. The style of these riads has changed over the years, but the basic form is still used in designs today.

In many cases, especially for palaces, the gardens were surrounded by a peristyle gallery. Moroccan houses were inward focused, which allowed for family privacy and protection from the weather. This inward focus was expressed with a centrally placed interior garden or courtyard, and the lack of large windows on the exterior walls of rammed earth or mud brick. This design principle also found support in the social mores of Islamic society, which placed great value on privacy and encouraged a separation between private family spaces (where women notably lived and worked) and semi-public spaces where outside guests were received. The central gardens of traditional riads were often planted with fruit trees such as orange trees or lemon trees. The walls of the riads could be adorned with tadelakt plaster, stucco decoration, and zellij tiles, sometimes with Arabic calligraphy and quotes from the Quran.

== Tourism ==
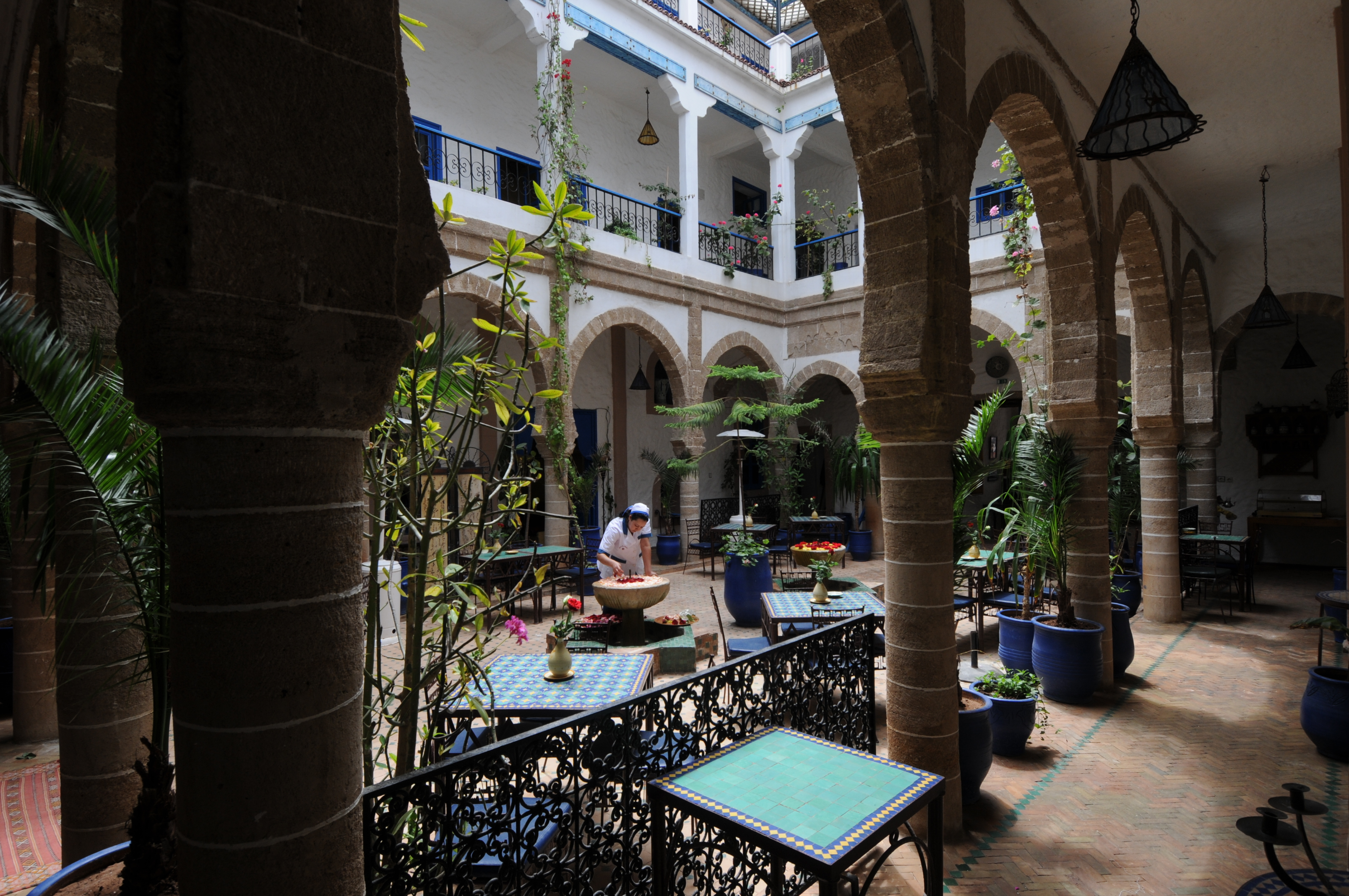
Courtyard of a riad guesthouse in Essaouira (Riad du Figuier)

In recent years there has been a surge of interest in using traditional Moroccan houses as part of the country's tourism industry. In this context, the term riad has become a common term to denote traditional Moroccan houses in general, particularly those converted into tourist accommodation. This interest has led to a wave of renovations in towns such as Marrakesh, Essaouira, and Fes, where many of these often-crumbling houses have been restored and converted to hotels, guesthouses, or restaurants. Many of the crumbling or ruined properties in Marrakech have been bought by foreigners. This foreign interest has brought new challenges but the investment has helped with the restoration of the UNESCO site and has helped revive many of the handcrafts and artisan trades that were gradually being lost before this trend.

== See also ==
- Andalusian patio
- Courtyard house
