= Dar Cherifa =

Historic house in Marrakesh, Morocco

Coordinates: 31°37′45″N 7°59′24.5″W

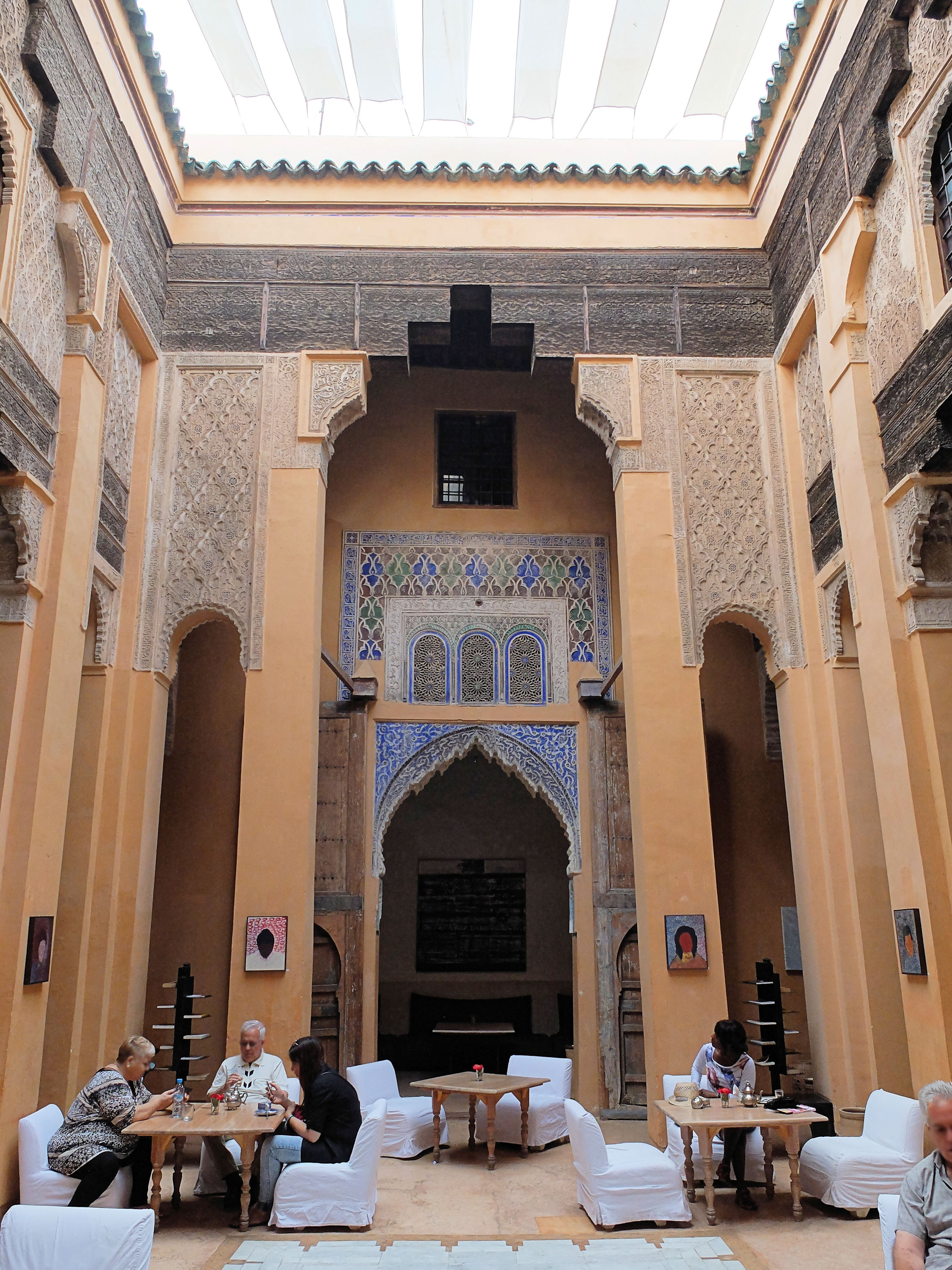
The central courtyard of the house (photo from 2015)

Dar Cherifa, historically known as Dar Ijimi, is a late 16th-century house in the medina (old city) of Marrakesh, Morocco. It is located in the Mouassine neighbourhood and is one of the few well-preserved houses from the Saadian period in the city. In recent years it has been restored and is now used as a café and art gallery.

== History ==
The house has been dated to the Saadian period in the second half of the 16th century, possibly to the reign of Sultan Abdallah al-Ghalib, thanks to its style and to the similarity of its decoration with that of contemporary monuments like the Ben Youssef Madrasa. This would also coincide with al-Ghalib's major construction projects in the Mouassine neighbourhood, which saw the old Jewish quarter displaced (moved to the new Mellah) and a new organized Islamic neighbourhood created around the new Mouassine Mosque.

Because of the house's rich decoration, it is assumed to have been built by an aristocratic or wealthy family. It is one of only a handful of historic houses in the city that date from this period – along with the Dar al-Masluhiyyin and the ruined Dar al-Mas'udiyyin – which in turn makes it among the oldest houses of its kind in Marrakesh. The house was known until recently as Dar Ijimi, after the family that lived there. It was purchased and restored in 2000 by Abdellatif Aït Ben Abdallah and since then opened as a café and cultural venue.

== Architecture ==
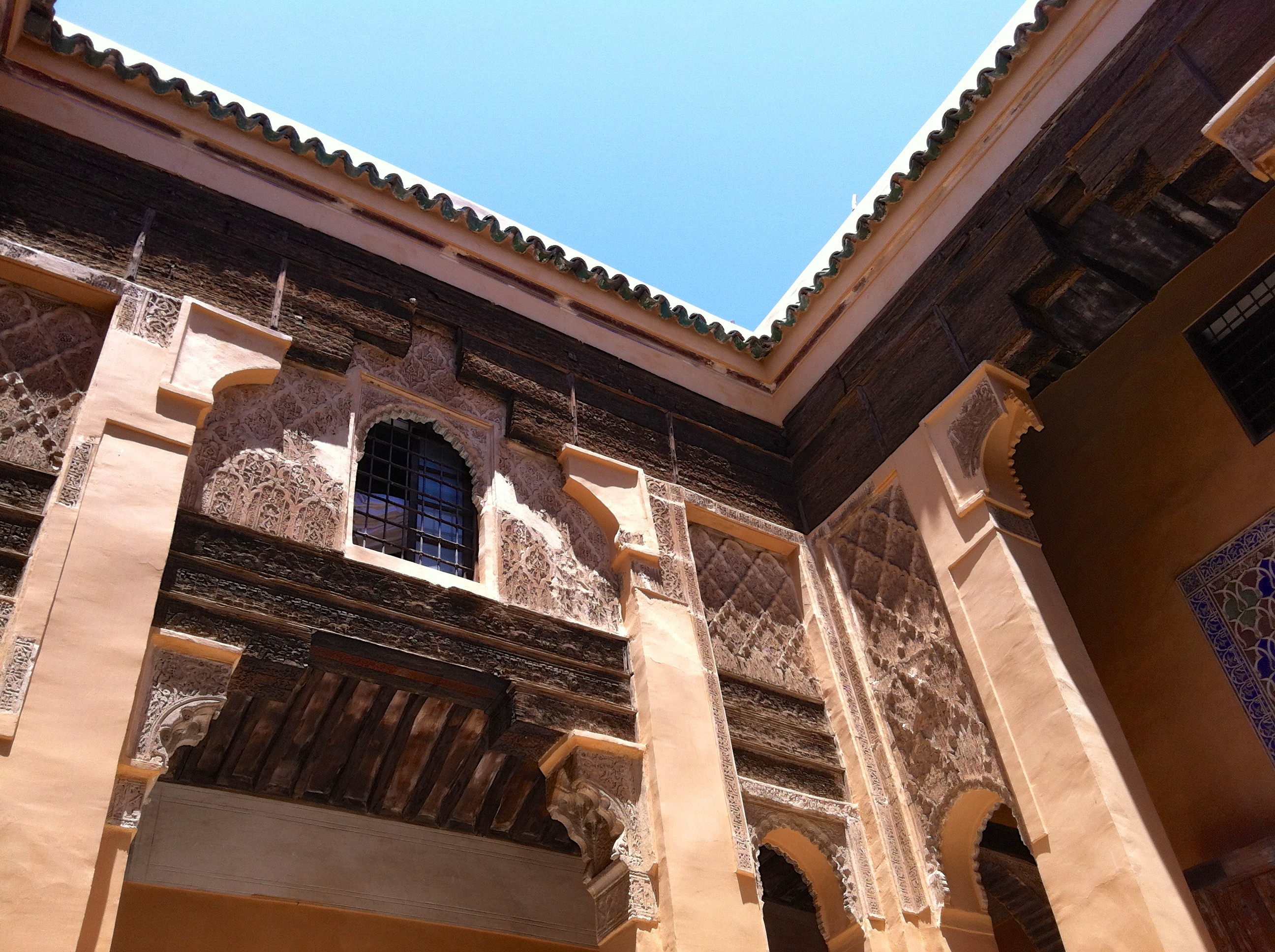
Detail of the gallery and upper floor façade

The house is located in a small derb (alley) called Derb Chorfa Lakbir, a short distance west of the Mouassine Mosque. The design of the house continued the traditional forms of earlier Marinid-period houses in Morocco. It has a tall ground floor and a shorter upper floor, both arranged around a deep central patio or courtyard. Twelve pillars are arranged in clusters of three at each corner of the courtyard, forming a shallow gallery around it. The short spaces between the pillars of a same cluster are covered by small round arches surmounted by vertical zones of carved stucco decoration. The much wider openings between the pillar clusters are bridged by corbelled arches consisting of carved cedar-wood lintels. On two of the courtyard's sides facing each other, the corbelled arches are situated high above the courtyard and allow an uninterrupted view of the tall and ornate doorways leading to rooms around the courtyard. These doorways consist of lambrequin arches with muqarnas-sculpted intrados. On the other two sides of the courtyard the corbelled arches are lower and are surmounted by a wide zone of stucco decoration pierced with an arched window from the upper-floor rooms.

The tall doorways off the courtyard are highlighted with further stucco decoration above the arch, including three false windows carved with geometric patterns, set within several rectangular frames filled with other arabesque or Kufic motifs. The zones of stucco decoration on the façades of the courtyard gallery feature sebka motifs filled with arabesques, in a style very similar to the stucco decoration of the Ben Youssef Madrasa built under Abdallah al-Ghalib. Arabic inscriptions with religious connotations are found carved on the wooden lintels and some of the stucco elements.
