= Kuttab =

Traditional elementary school in the Islamic world

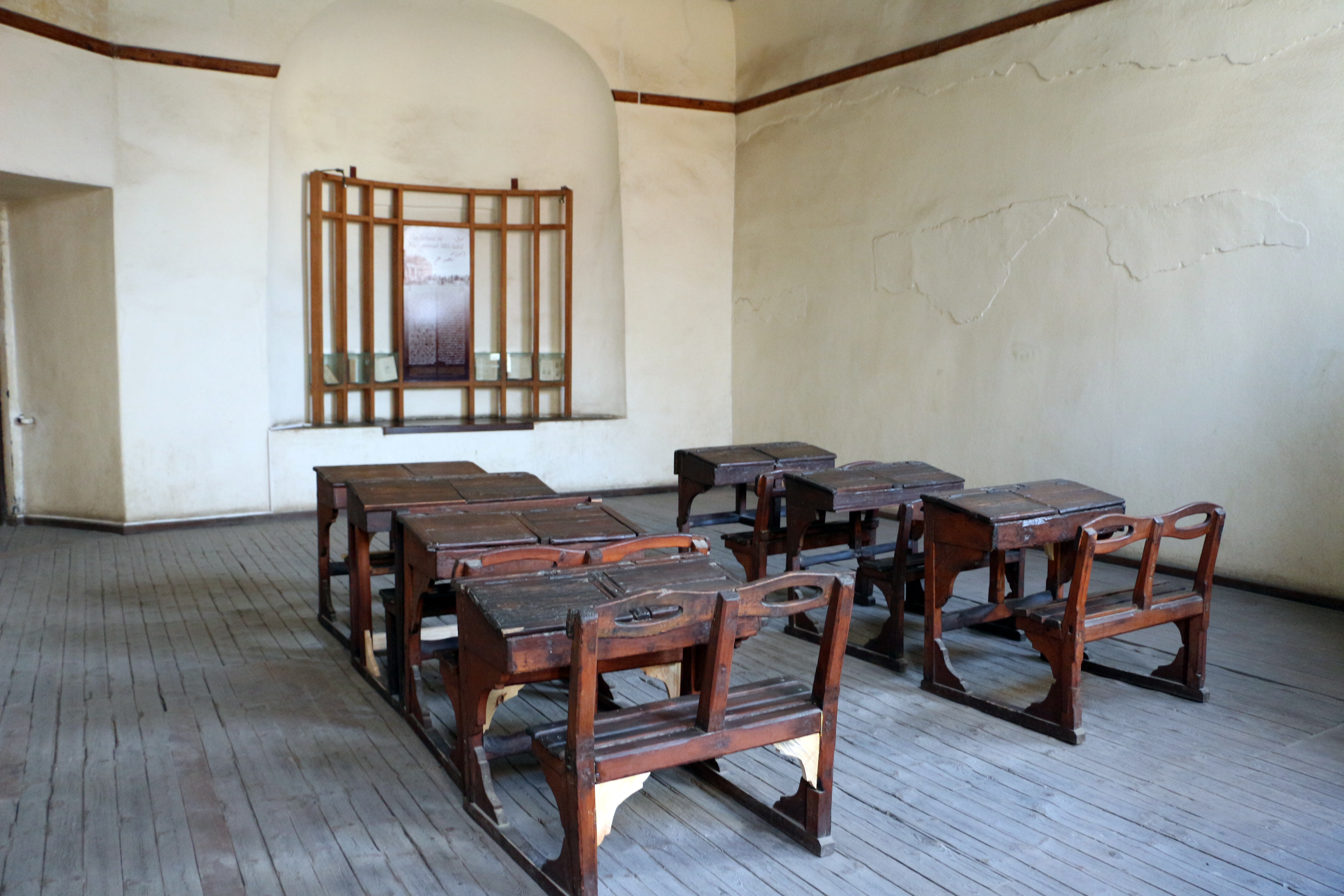
Interior of a 19th-century kuttab in Cairo, Egypt

A kuttab (Arabic: كُتَّاب kuttāb, plural: kataatiib, كَتاتِيبُ) or maktab (Arabic: مَكْتَب) is a type of elementary school in the Muslim world. Though the kuttab was primarily used for teaching children in reading, writing, grammar, and Islamic studies, such as memorizing and reciting the Qur'an (including Qira'at), other practical and theoretical subjects were also often taught. The kuttāb represents an old-fashioned method of education in Muslim majority countries, in which a sheikh teaches a group of students who sit in front of him on the ground. Until the 20th century, when modern schools developed, kuttabs were the prevalent means of mass education in much of the Islamic world.

== Name ==
Kuttab refers to only elementary schools in Arabic. This institution can also be called a maktab (مَكْتَب) or maktaba (مَكْتَبَة) in Arabic—with many transliterations. In common Modern Standard Arabic usage, maktab means "office" while maktabah means "library" or "(place of) study" and kuttāb is a plural word meaning "writers". It shares a root (k-t-b ك ت ب) with كِتَاب kitāb 'book'. In Morocco, this institution can be referred to as a m'siid (مْسِيد).

The Classical Persian word مکتبخانه maktabkhāna has been used in Iranian Persian (maktabkhâneh) as well as in Azerbaijani (məktəbxana), in Ottoman Turkish (مكتبخانه; modern Turkish: mektephane) and in Uzbek (maktabxona), often alongside مکتب maktab (Azerbaijani: məktəb; Turkish: mektep; etc.). Maktab is used in Dari Persian in Afghanistan as an equivalent term to school, including both primary and secondary schools. In Bosnian, it is called a mejtef or mekteb.

== History ==
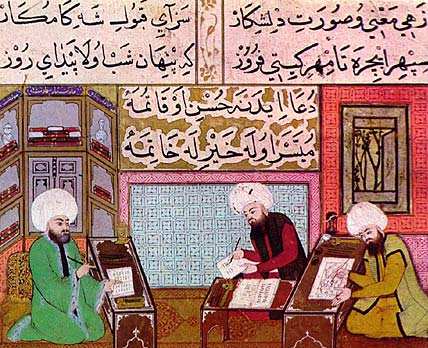
Scholars and students in an Ottoman maktab

In the medieval Islamic world, an elementary school was known as a maktab, which dates back to at least the tenth century. Like madrasas (which referred to higher education), a maktab was often attached to a mosque. In the 16th century, the Sunni Islamic jurist Ibn Hajar al-Haytami discussed maktab schools. In response to a petition from a retired Shia Islamic judge who ran a Madhab elementary school for orphans, al-Haytami issues a fatwa outlining a structure of maktab education that prevented any physical or economic exploitation of enrolled orphans.

In the 11th century, the famous Persian Islamic philosopher and teacher, Ibn Sina (known as Avicenna in the West), in one of his books, wrote a chapter dealing with the maktab entitled "The Role of the Teacher in the Training and Upbringing of Children", as a guide to teachers working at maktab schools. He wrote that children can learn better if taught in classes instead of individual tuition from private tutors, and he gave a number of reasons for why this is the case, citing the value of competition and emulation among pupils as well as the usefulness of group discussions and debates. Ibn Sina described the curriculum of a maktab school in some detail, describing the curricula for two stages of education in a maktab school.

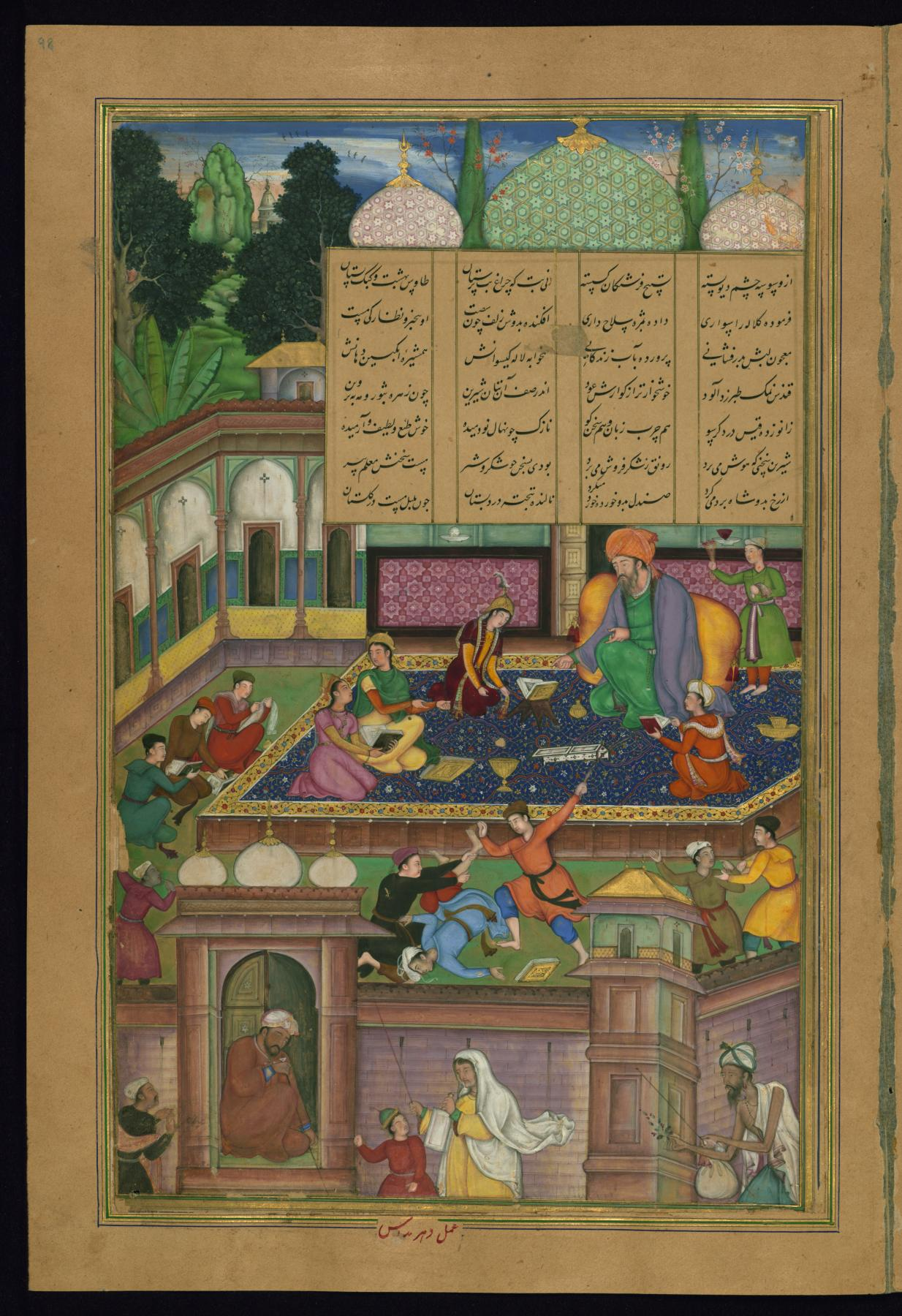
A Mughal maktab in Lahore. Painting by Dharmadasa c. 1597-1598.

=== Primary education ===
Ibn Sina wrote that children should be sent to a maktab school from the age of 6 and be taught primary education until they reach the age of 14. During which time, he wrote that they should be taught the Qur'an, Islamic metaphysics, language, literature, Islamic ethics, and manual skills (which could refer to a variety of practical skills).

=== Secondary education ===
Ibn Sina refers to the secondary education stage of maktab schooling as the period of specialization, when pupils should begin to acquire manual skills, regardless of their social status. He writes that children after the age of 14 should be given a choice to choose and specialize in subjects they have an interest in, whether it was reading, manual skills, literature, preaching, medicine, geometry, trade and commerce, craftsmanship, or any other subject or profession they would be interested in pursuing for a future career. He wrote that this was a transitional stage and that there needs to be flexibility regarding the age in which pupils graduate, as the student's emotional development and chosen subjects need to be taken into account.

=== Literacy ===
In medieval times, the Caliphate experienced a growth in literacy, having the highest literacy rate of the Middle Ages, comparable to classical Athens' literacy in antiquity. The emergence of the maktab and madrasa institutions played a fundamental role in the relatively high literacy rates of the medieval Islamic world.

== Architecture ==
In many regions of the Islamic world, kuttabs were historically built as part of religious and charitable complexes sponsored by rulers or local elites. In Egypt – especially Cairo – kuttabs were often paired with sabils (kiosks dispensing water to the public). They usually consisted of a room built above the sabil. These "sabil-kuttabs" were a common feature of the architectural complexes in Mamluk architecture and subsequent Ottoman Egyptian architecture. In Ottoman architecture, the mektep or sibyan mektebi (both Turkish terms for the kuttab/maktab) was a recurring element of külliyes or religious complexes. In Istanbul, mekteps were included in the Fatih Mosque complex, the Süleymaniye complex, the Atik Valide Mosque complex, the Yeni Valide Mosque complex, among many other examples. In Morocco, an m'sid (the local term for a kuttab) was included in some charitable complexes such as those of the Bab Doukkala Mosque and the Mouassine Mosque, both built in Marrakesh by the Saadi dynasty.

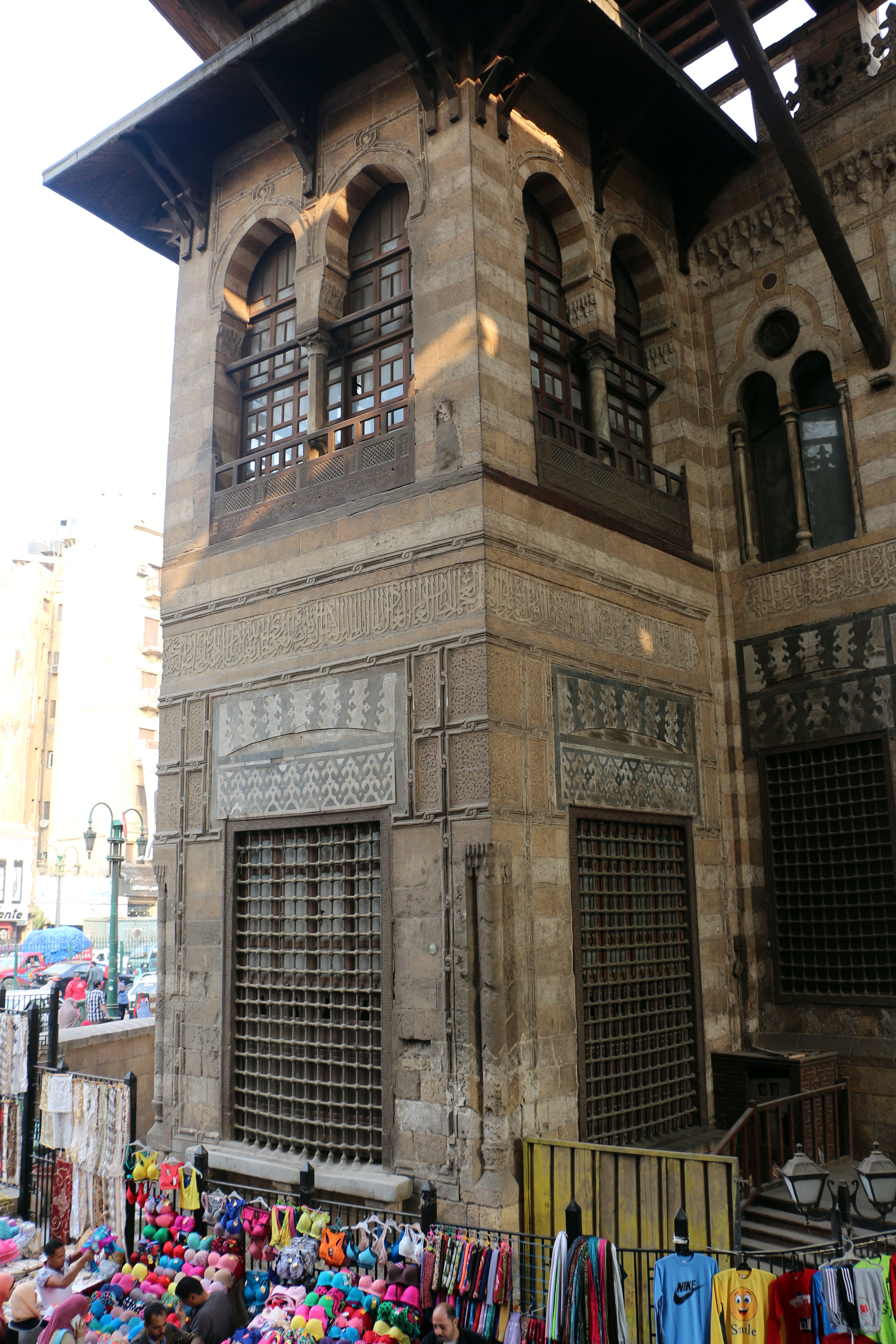
A kuttab (above) and a sabil (below) at the Funerary complex of al-Ghuri in Cairo, Egypt

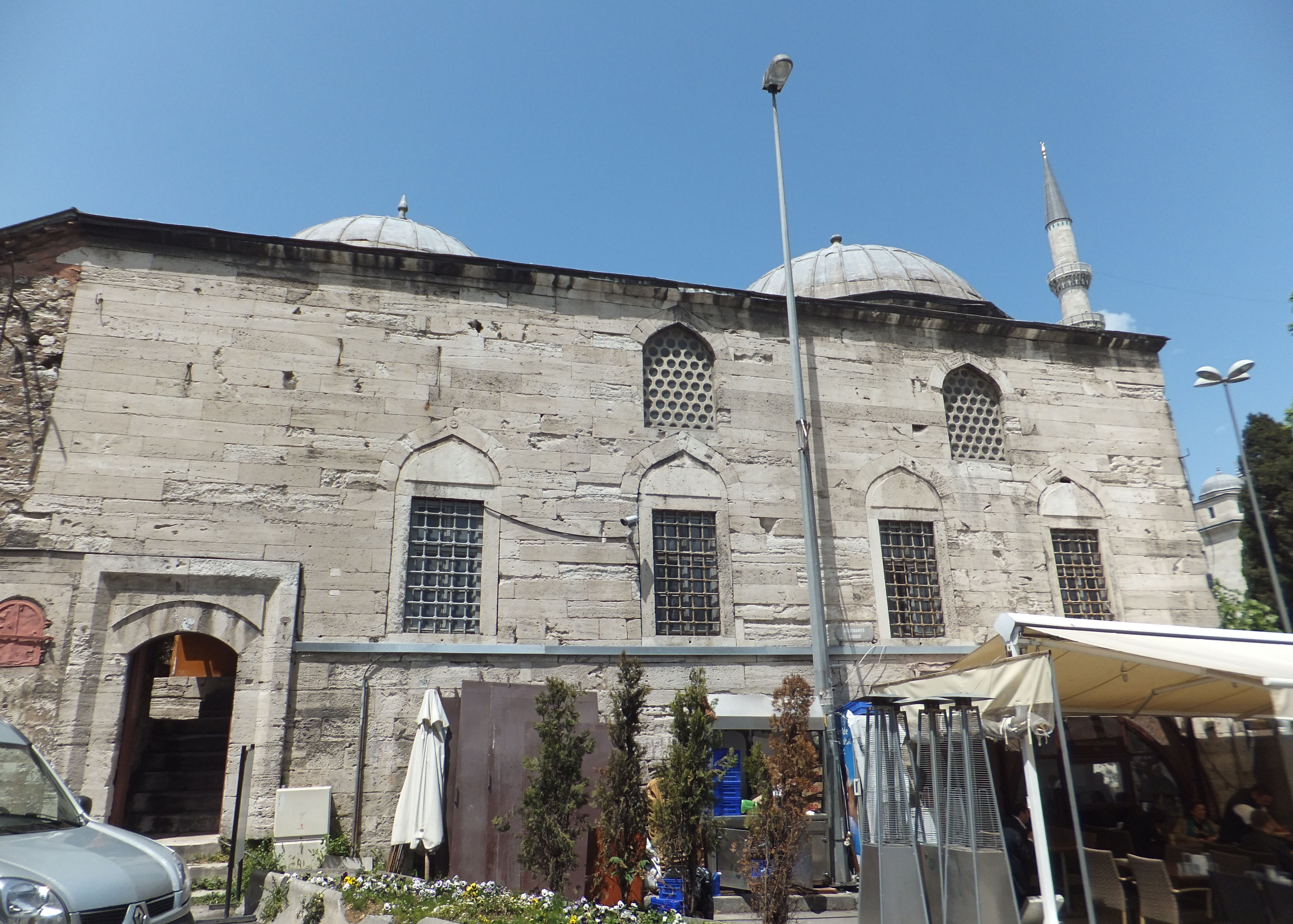
Mektep building at the Süleymaniye complex in Istanbul, Turkey
