= Shrob ou Shouf Fountain =

Historic monument in Marrakesh, Morocco

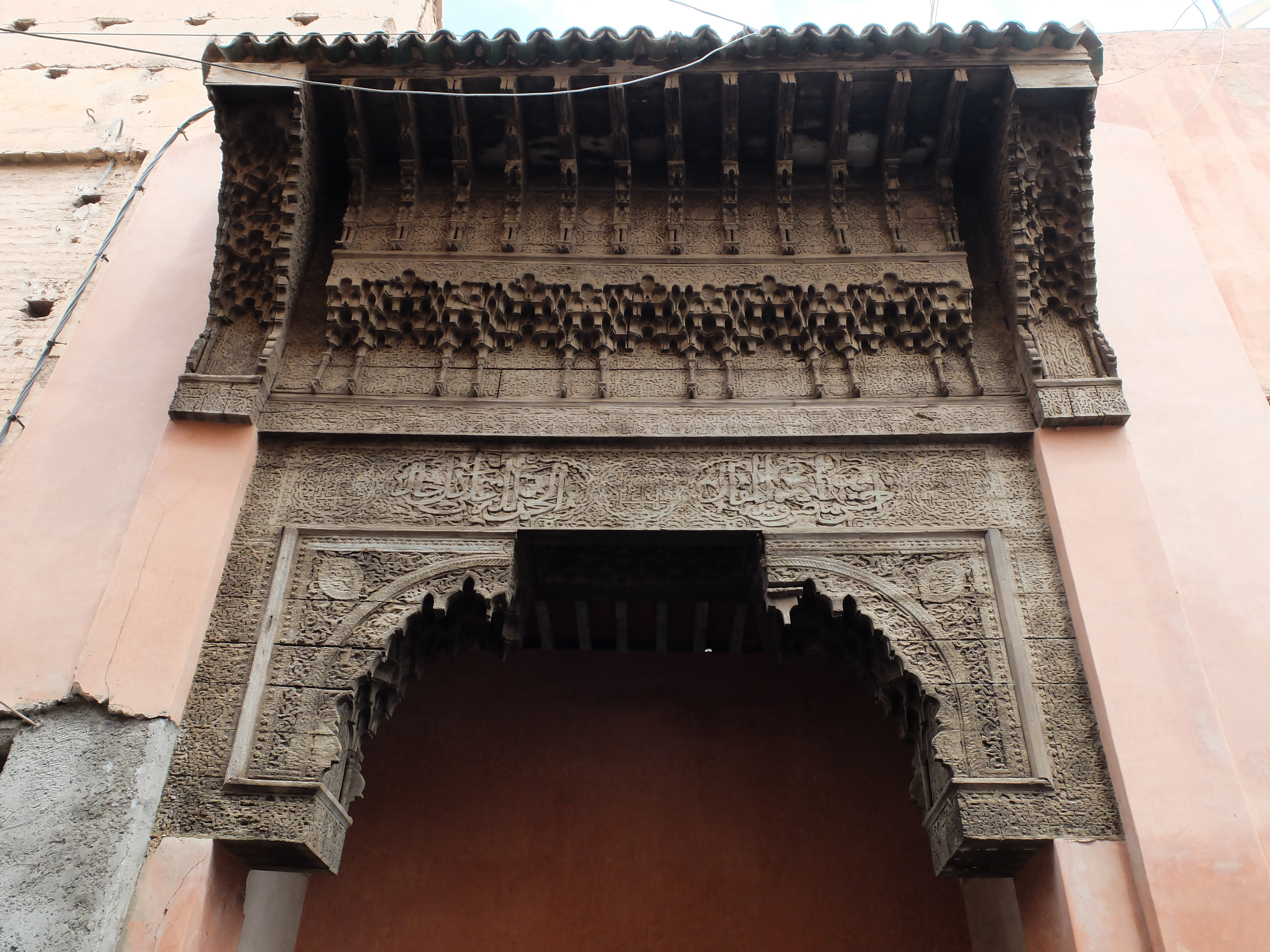
- Interactive map of Shrob ou Shouf Fountain
- Type: Fountain
- Coordinates: 31°38′0.6″N 7°59′15.7″W
- Area: Marrakesh, Morocco
- Built: late 16th or early 17th century
- Architectural styles: Saadian, Moroccan, Islamic

The Shrob ou Shouf Fountain or Chrob ou Chouf Fountain (Moroccan Arabic: شرب وشوف, romanized: shrob u shuf, lit. 'drink and look') is a historic wall fountain in the medina of Marrakesh, Morocco. It dates from the late 16th or early 17th century and is located near the Ben Youssef Madrasa.

== Historical background ==
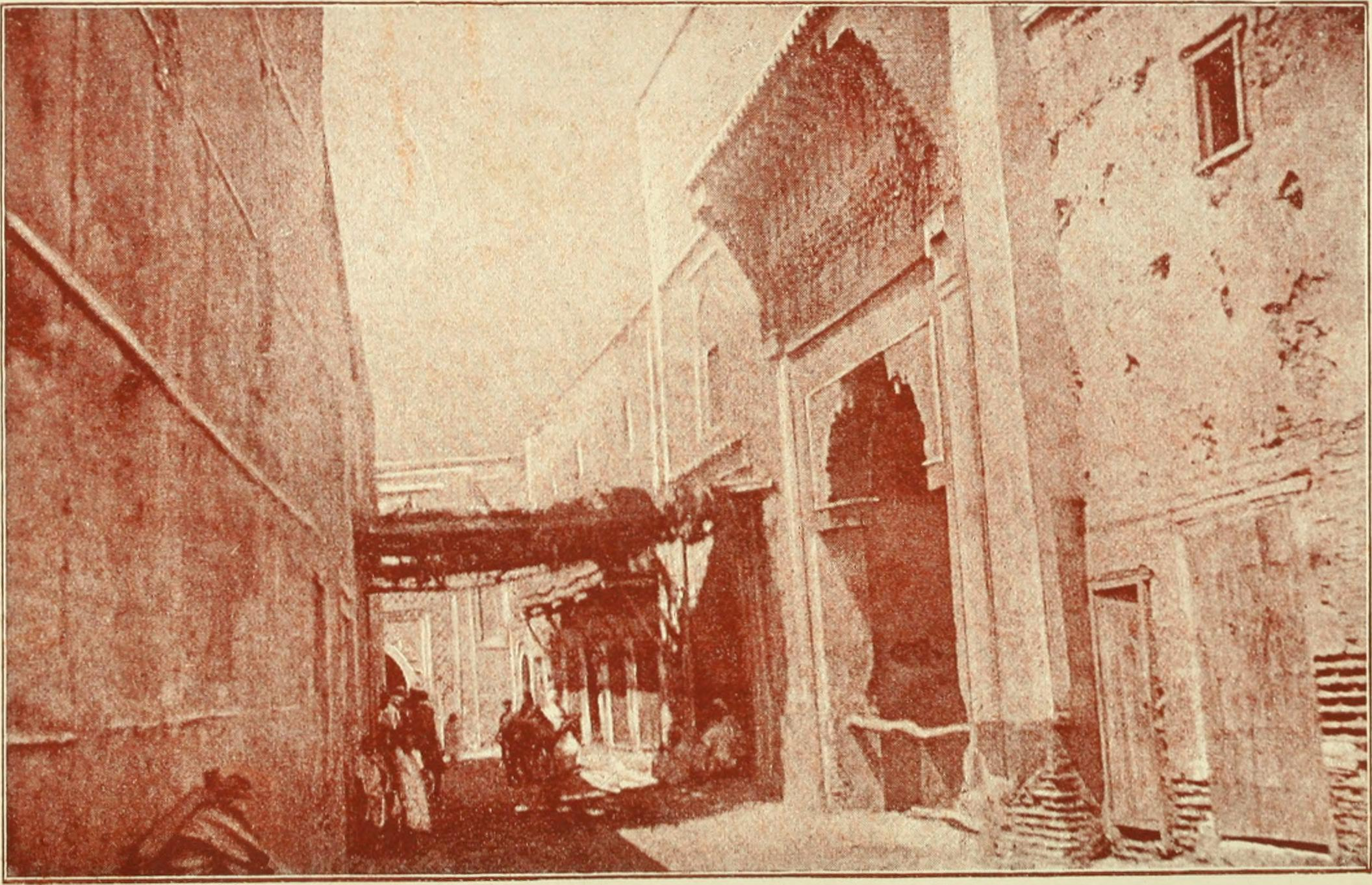
View of Shrob ou Shouf Fountain in the late 19th century (on the right). The wooden bar across the opening of the fountain, to block animals from drinking, is visible.

The fountain was constructed during the Saadian era, a period when Marrakesh served as the capital of the dynasty. Its architectural form resembles other Saadian fountains in style (e.g. the fountains of the Mouassine Mosque and Bab Doukkala Mosque). Although the date and founder of the structure are not directly identified, some attribute the fountain to the reign of Sultan Ahmad al-Mansur (1578-1603).

The name of the fountain today means "drink and look" in Moroccan Arabic (implying that one should admire the fountain as well as use it).

== Description ==
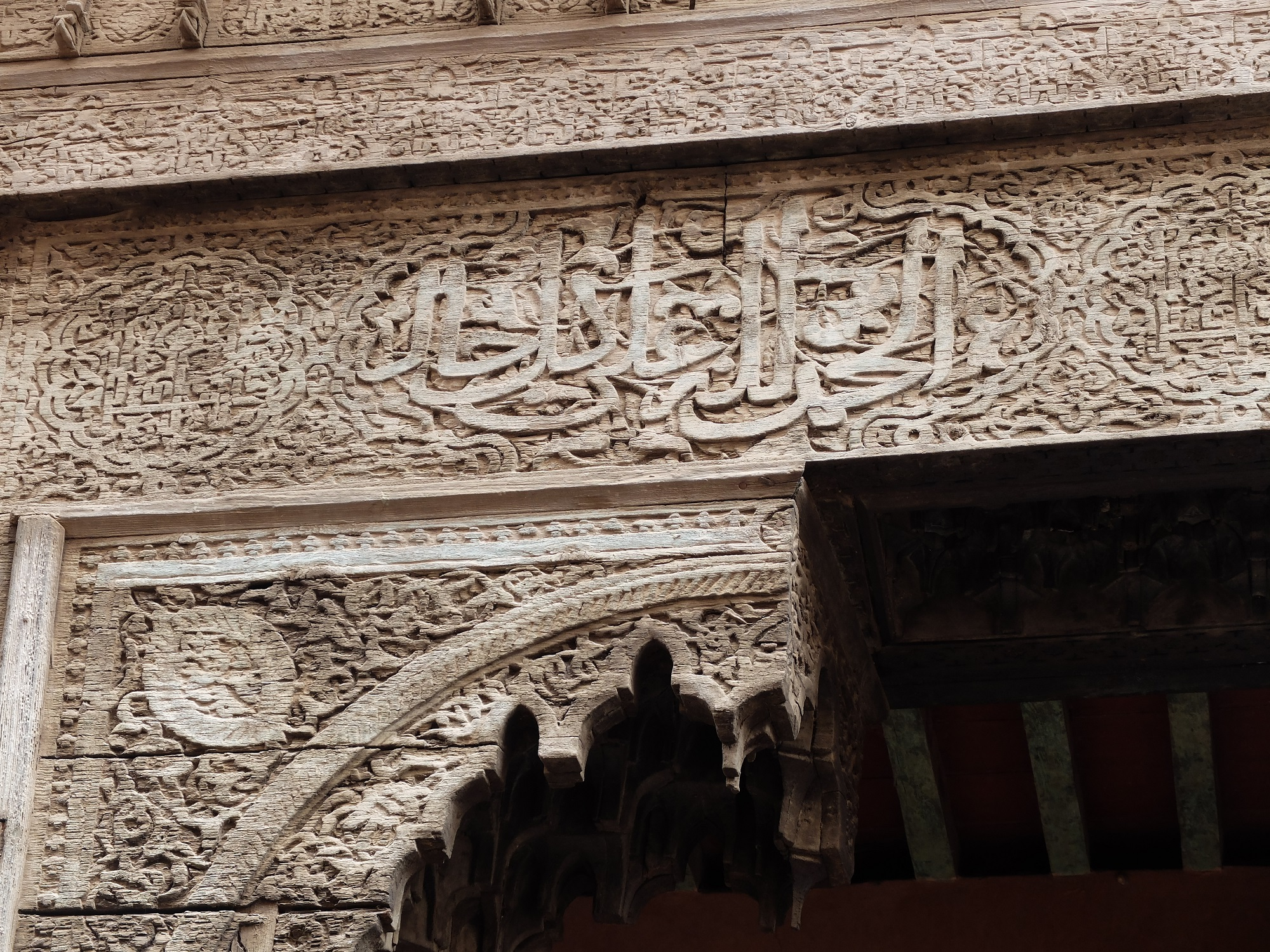
Details of the lintel (with part of the inscription) and spandrels of the wooden canopy.

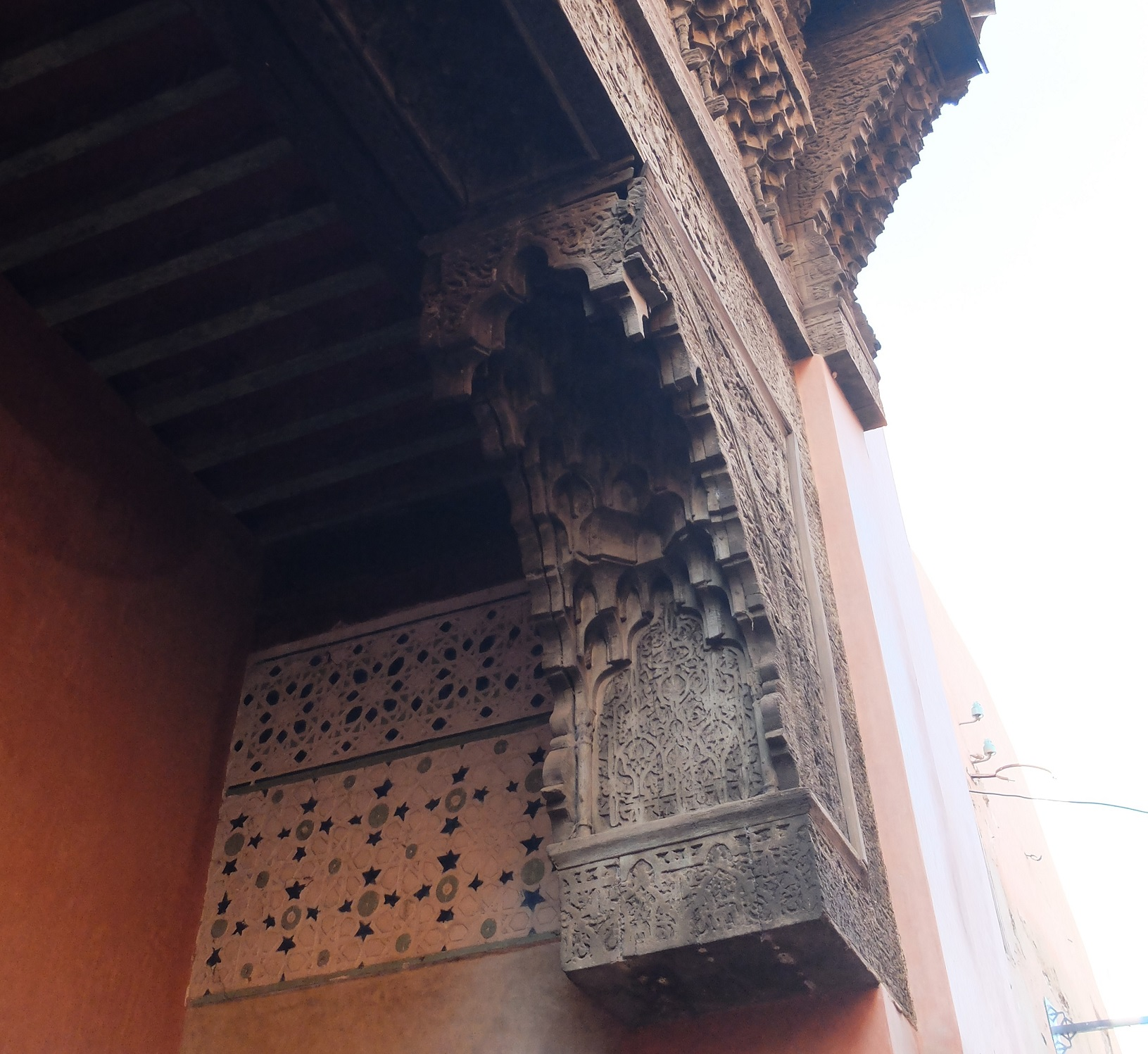
Details of the wooden corbels and of the stucco decoration inside the loggia (possibly truncated on the left by a filled-in wall)

The fountain consists of a simple loggia or large alcove sheltering an access to water. Old photographs show that the loggia was once deeper and included a basin for the water at the base of the innermost wall, while a wooden bar across its entrance prevented animals (e.g. donkeys, horses) from drinking the same water as humans. At some point in modern times, however, the space appears to have been modified or partially filled in (the back wall was probably moved forward), so that today the loggia seems to be shallower than it was and some of these elements (like the basin ) have disappeared.

The lower part of the fountain, at ground level, is plain and features no (surviving) decoration. Above, however, the fountain is sheltered by a canopy of finely carved palm wood in a typical Moroccan-Andalusian (or Moorish) style. Much of the canopy's surface is carved with arabesque patterns, and many of its elements are carved into muqarnas ("honeycomb"-style sculptures). The form and decoration of the canopy are particularly similar to that of other Saadian wall fountains of the period (e.g. those of the Mouassine and Bab Doukkala mosques), as well as the carved wooden canopies of the Saadian Tombs and of the Saadian pavilions in the courtyard of the Qarawiyyin Mosque. The spandrels of the wooden arch feature a mandorla-type (or almond-shaped) motif, which may be of Ottoman influence. Carved into the lintel are two cartouches containing Arabic calligraphic inscriptions in thuluth style, with verses praising God: "The most beautiful words that have been said are: praise to God in all circumstances!" (approximate translation). The same verses are also found on the lintels of the fountains of the Mouassine and Bab Doukkala mosques from the same period. Above the lintel, the wooden canopy culminates in a wide parapet projecting over the street, the top of which is roofed with green tiles.

== See also ==
- Mouassine Fountain
- Ben Youssef Madrasa
- Saadian Tombs
- El Badi Palace
