= Bab Doukkala Mosque =

Mosque in Marrakesh, Morocco

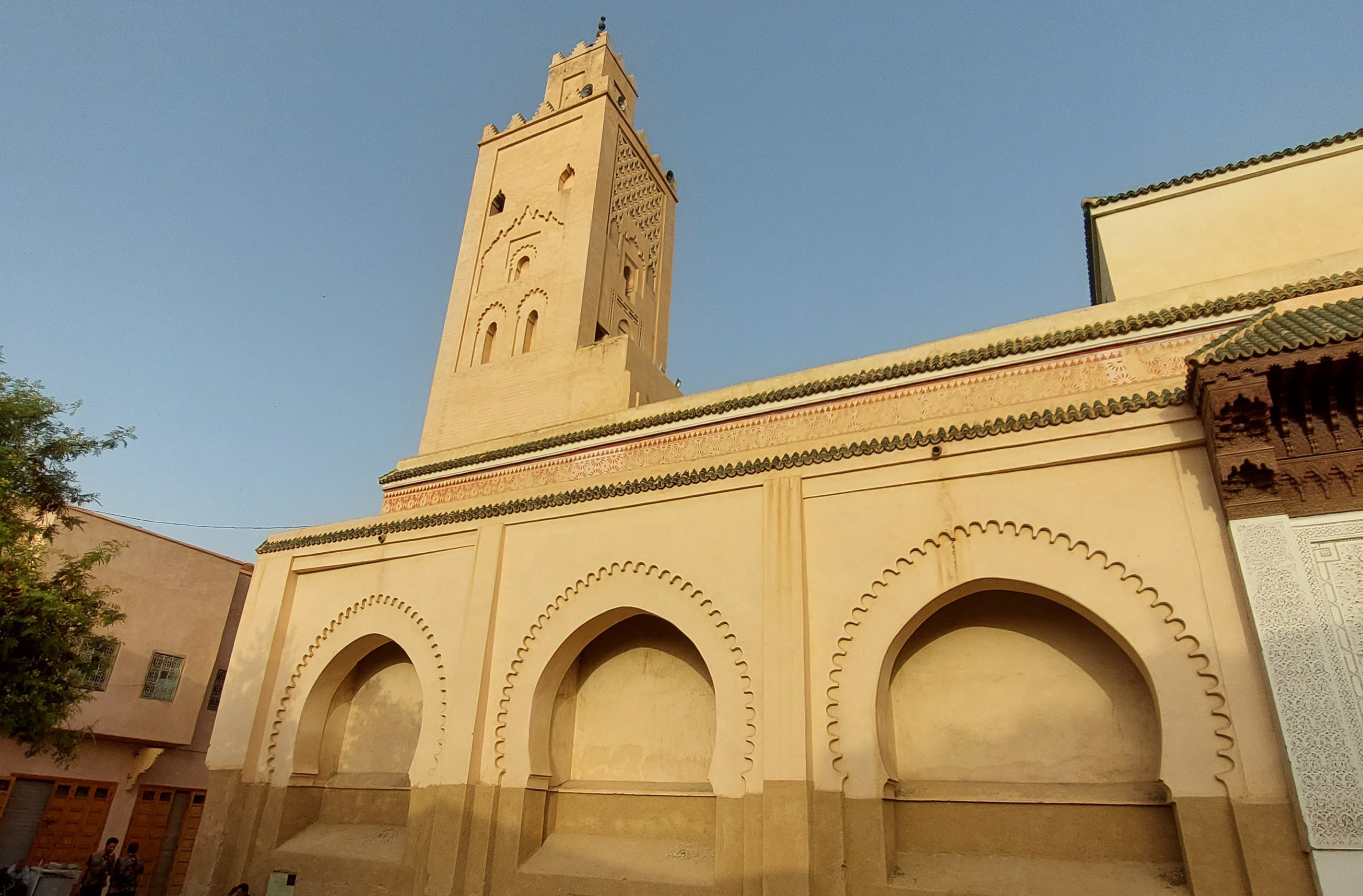

Religion
- Affiliation: Sunni Islam
- Status: Active

Location
- Location: Marrakesh, Morocco
- Interactive map of Bab Doukkala Mosque
- Coordinates: 31°37′52″N 7°59′44.7″W

Architecture
- Type: Mosque
- Style: Moorish (Saadian)
- Founder: Lalla Ma'suda bint Ahmad
- Groundbreaking: 1557–1558
- Completed: 1570–1571

Specifications
- Minaret: 1
- Materials: brick, wood

The Bab Doukkala Mosque (Arabic: مسجد باب دكالة) or Mosque of Bab Doukkala is a mosque in Marrakesh, Morocco. It is named after the nearby western city gate, Bab Doukkala. It was built in the 16th century during the Saadian period. It is also known as the al-Hurra Mosque ("Mosque of the Free One"), in reference to its founder, Massa'uda al-Wizkitiya. Like the contemporary Mouassine Mosque to the southeast, it was built as a Friday mosque for what was a newly redeveloped neighbourhood at the time. It formed the main element in a larger religious-charitable complex that also included a madrasa, a hammam, a library, a fountain, and more.

== Historical background ==
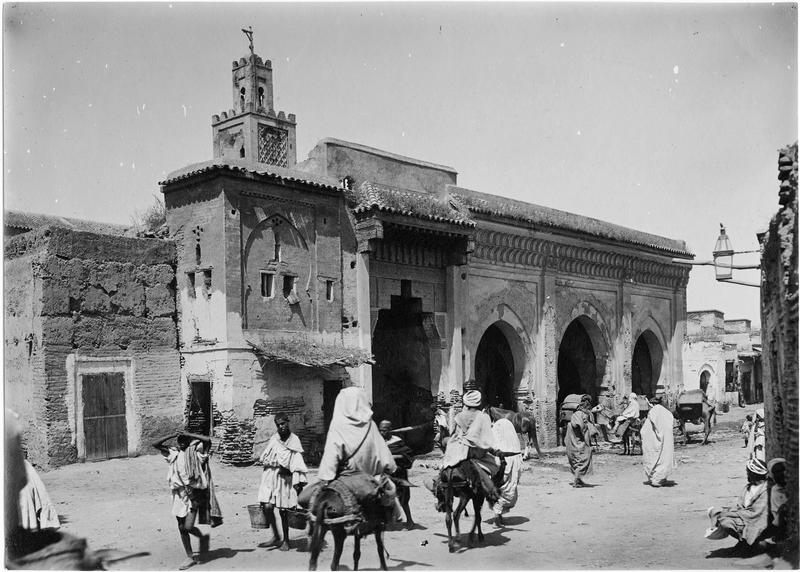
The fountain, adjoined to the ablutions annex (north of the mosque), seen in 1915

It was commissioned by Lalla Mas'uda bint Ahmad, a wife of Muhammad al-Sheikh (the founder of the ruling Saadian dynasty) and mother of the future sultan Ahmad al-Mansur. Construction of the mosque began in 1557–1558 CE (965 AH) and probably finished around 1570–1571 CE (979 AH), which would have been during the reign of Abdallah al-Ghalib. Lalla Ma'suda's status as a powerful and "free" or independent woman may have given the mosque its alternate name of Jami' al-Hurra ("Mosque of Freedom").

In 1557–1558 CE the sultan had ordered that the Jewish population of the city relocate to an area closer to the Kasbah (royal citadel), resulting in the creation of a Jewish mellah which continued to exist into modern times. Construction of the new mellah was probably finished around 1562–1563. Meanwhile, the emptying of the old Jewish neighbourhoods had liberated a large amount of space within the city which was open to redevelopment. The Bab Doukkala Mosque, along with the Mouassine Mosque built around the same time, appears to have been part of a larger plan to build new "model" neighbourhoods in the area. It was conceived as part of a coherent religious and civic complex which included, in addition to the mosque itself, a madrasa, library, hammam (public bathhouse) with latrines, an ablutions house or mida'a (Arabic: ميضأة), and a public fountain for distributing water to the locals. Although many Marinid-era mosques were also built with attached facilities, this type of grand architectural complex was unprecedented in Morocco and may have been influenced by the tradition of building such complexes in Mamluk Egypt and in the Ottoman Empire.

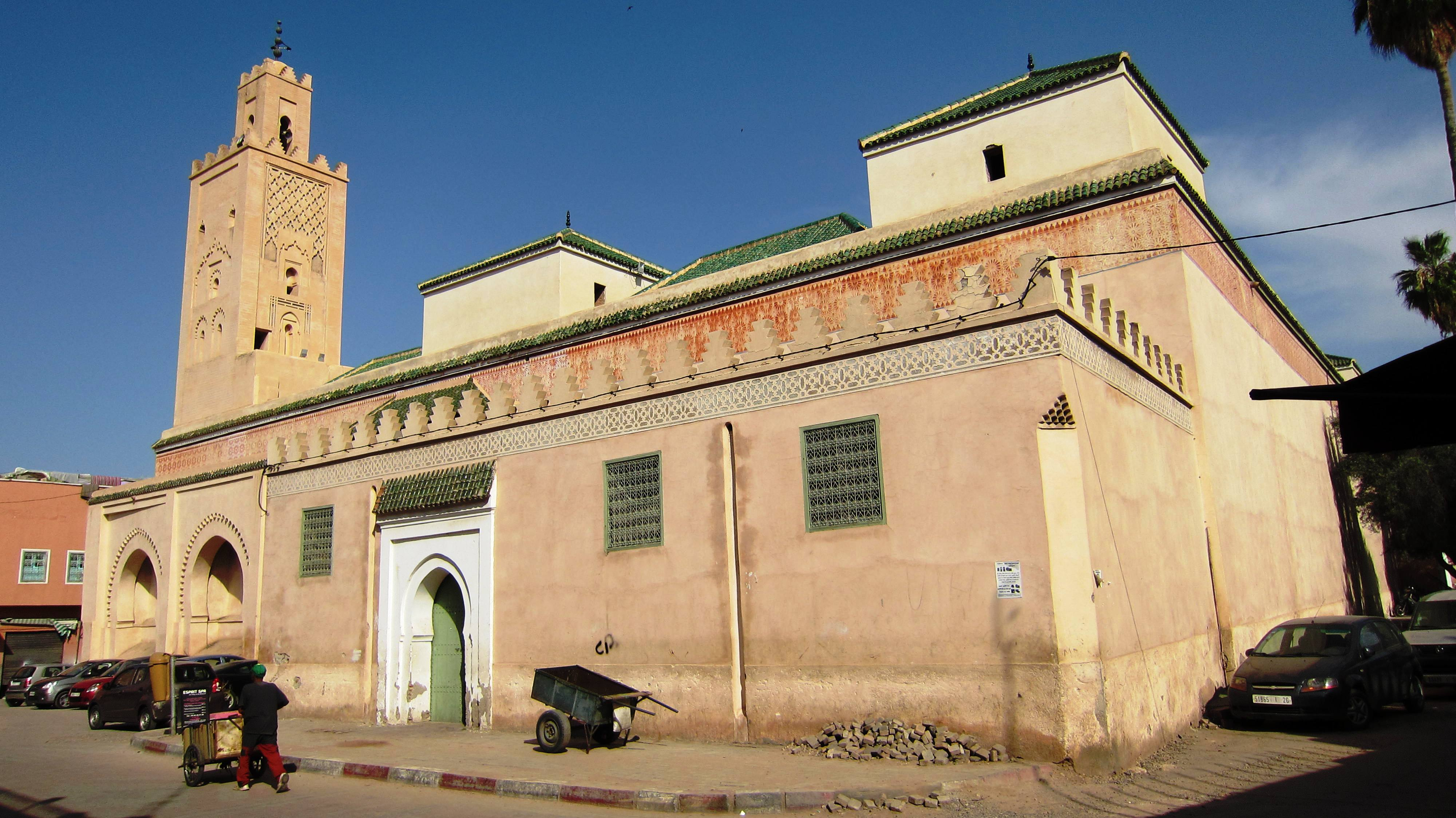
The mosque in 2011

The minaret appears to have been added some time after the mosque's construction. Based on its style, Xavier Salmon suggests that it may have been built around the same time as the minaret of the Zawiya of Sidi Bel Abbes (built by Abu Faris Abdallah), at the beginning of the 17th century. The three arches on the exterior northeastern facade of the mosque, near the minaret's base, probably also date from this time and served to reinforce the walls to support the minaret. Historian Gaston Deverdun argued that the mosque, the mida'a, the fountain, and the hammam of this complex were likely all built at the same time during the original construction, while the minaret, the small adjoining madrasa (no longer preserved), and the msid (Qur'anic school for children) formerly adjoined to the mida'a were of later construction (possibly later in the Saadian period).

== Architecture ==
=== The mosque ===
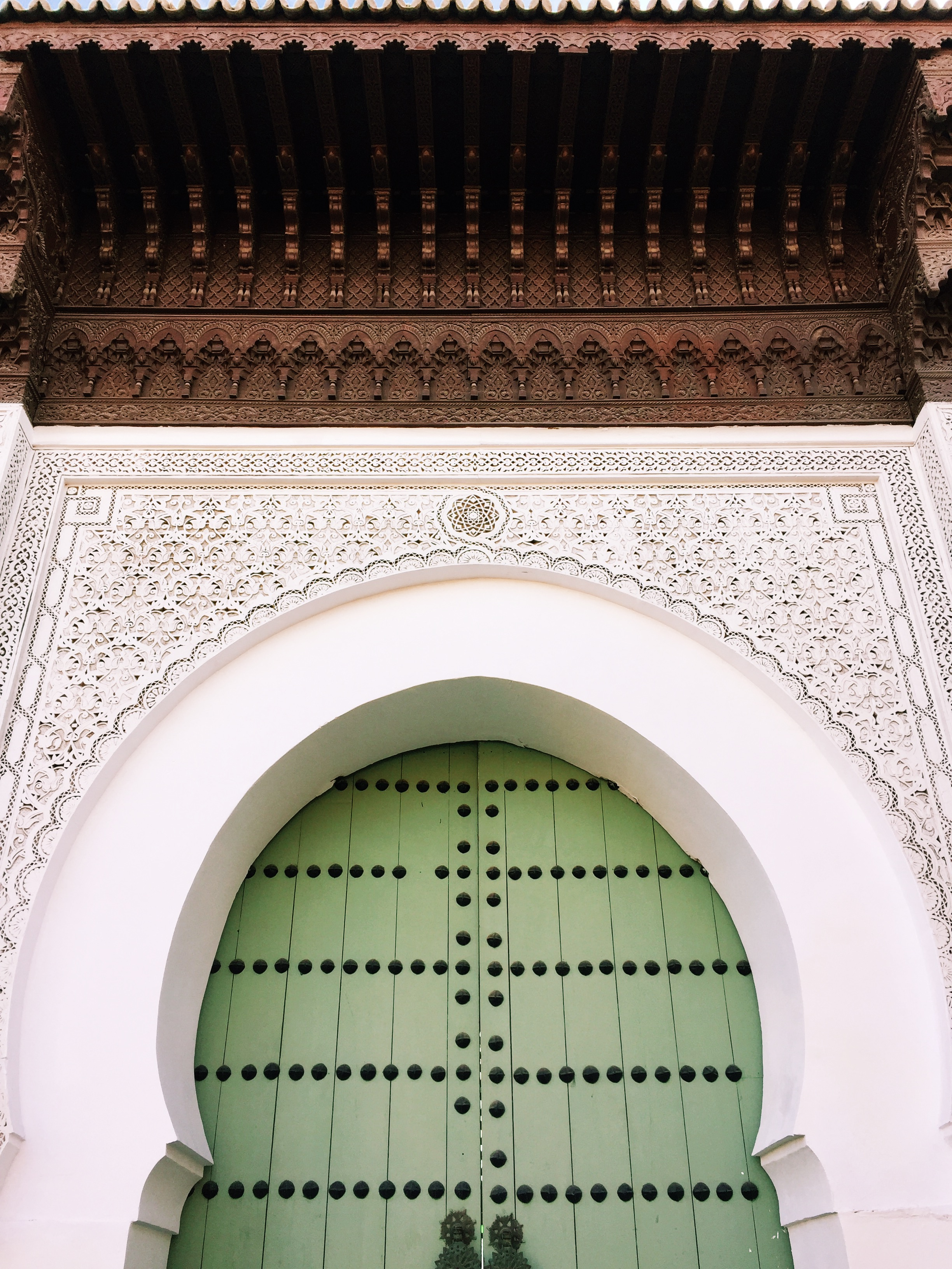
The northwestern entrance of the mosque (2017 photo)

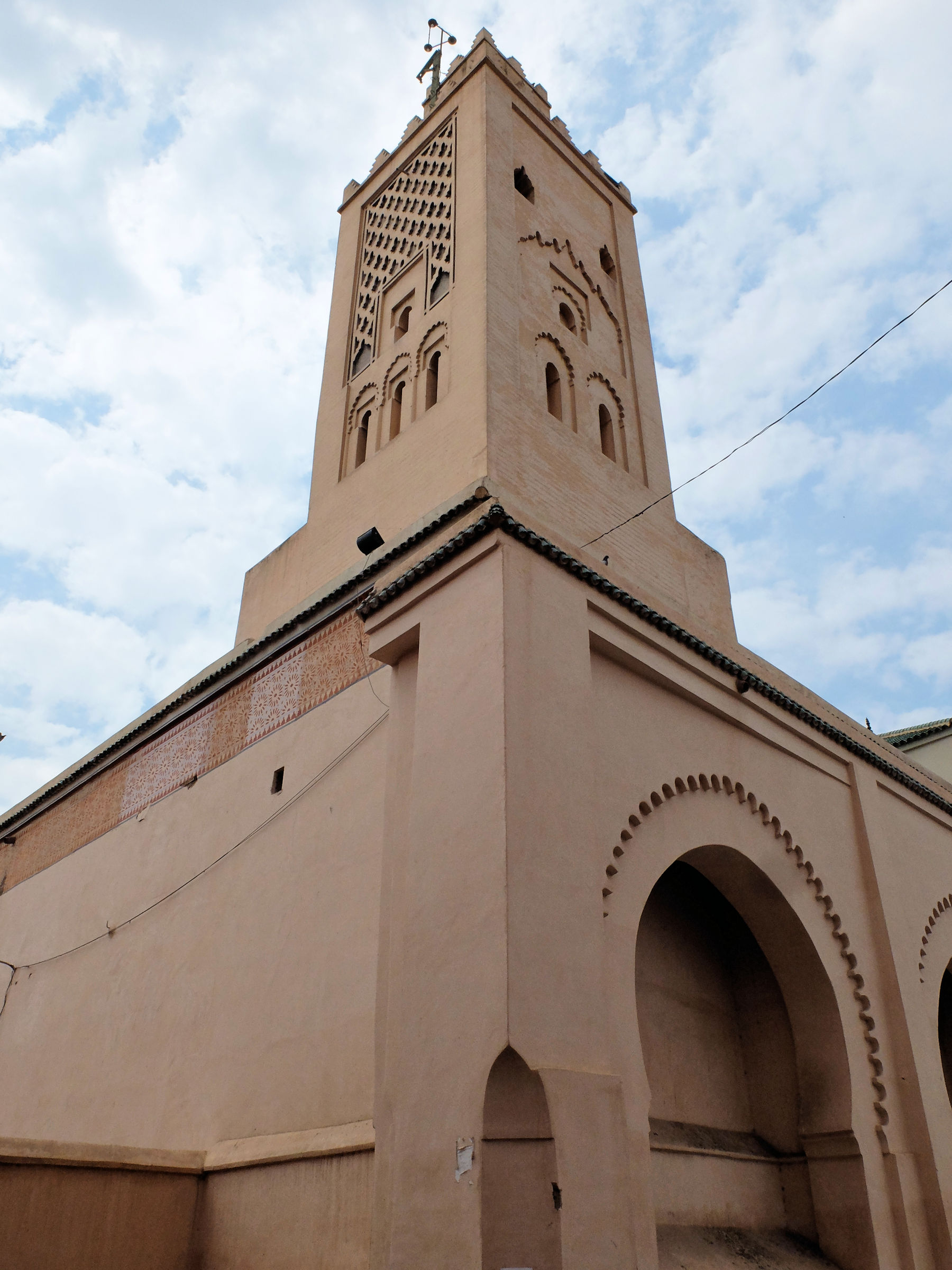
The minaret, rising above the northern corner of the mosque

The mosque's form and layout are highly similar to the Mouassine Mosque, which was built shortly after it. It also continues many of the architectural characteristics of the earlier Almohad mosques such as the Kutubiyya Mosque and the Tinmal Mosque. Although slightly smaller than the Mouassine Mosque, the architecture of the Bab Doukkala Mosque is in some ways more sophisticated and more carefully decorated. The mosque itself has a standard floor plan for the Saadian period: its southern section consists of a hypostyle prayer hall while its slightly larger northern section consists of a nearly square internal courtyard (a sahn) surrounded on all sides by a roofed gallery of arches. The courtyard measures 29 meters by 30 meters and has a fountain at its center. The minaret is located at the mosque's northeastern corner. Its façades are decorated with darj-wa-ktaf motifs and blind lambrequin arches.

The prayer hall is divided into 7 aisles or naves by rows of horseshoe arches running perpendicular to the southeastern wall (the qibla wall), with the central aisle slightly wider than the others. This central aisle is aligned with the mosque's mihrab (niche in the southeastern wall symbolizing the qibla) and is also highlighted at either end by a decorative cupola above. The cupola at the southeastern end, directly in front of the mihrab, has a typical square plan filled with muqarnas. The cupola at the northwestern end of the aisle, at the entrance from the courtyard, has an octagonal shape which is also filled with muqarnas compositions and whose transition with the square space below is achieved by four muqarnas squinches. This more elaborate creation may date from a renovation carried out in 1852-1853 CE (1269 AH) by Muhammad as-Sheikh al-M'amun (the future Muhammad IV) during Moulay Abd ar-Rahman's reign, as evidenced by an inscription on the cupola. Another aisle also runs along the length of the southeastern wall, parallel to it and perpendicular to the other aisles, thus forming a "T-plan" with the central aisle of the mosque. This transverse aisle is denoted from the rest of the mosque by a row of transverse arches (i.e. running perpendicular to the other arches of the mosque) with a pointed lambrequin profile. The mihrab is further highlighted with two lambrequin arches on either side, which continued the line of arches along the main central aisle of the mosque. The three lambrequin arches thus surrounding the mihrab, which are slightly more elaborate than all the others, are also decorated with muqarnas within their intrados. The transverse aisle is also highlighted by a square-based muqarnas cupola at both ends, in the southwestern and southeastern corners of the mosque. Lastly, the arches in the rest of the prayer hall are decorated with bands of stucco carved with relatively simple geometric decoration forming semi-rectangular frames on the wall surfaces around each arch.

The decoration of the mihrab consists of the usual carved stucco on the surface of the wall around its arched opening, featuring various arabesque motifs and a band of geometric motifs, along with an inscription in Kufic running in a square frame around the arch. The alcove inside the mihrab is covered by a small octagonal muqarnas cupola. Xavier Salmon notes that while the decoration of the mihrab in this and other Saadian mosques is highly similar to the earlier Almohad mosques of Marrakesh, the decoration is more repetitive and less diverse in its details, while at the same time multiplying the number of different bands or friezes with carved motifs.

At the southwestern corner of the mosque, extending from the transverse aisle in front of the qibla wall, is a room called the bayt al-'itikaf (Arabic: بيت الاعتكف) which served as a space for spiritual retreat. It consists of a small square chamber, accessed via a short staircase, with a double-arched window that opens back onto the prayer hall of the mosque. The window's arches have modest stucco decoration and its column is made of marble and features a capital carved with muqarnas. This feature is also found in the Mouassine Mosque, though the bayt al-'itikaf of the Mouassine Mosque has slightly richer decoration.

=== The street fountain and other annexes ===
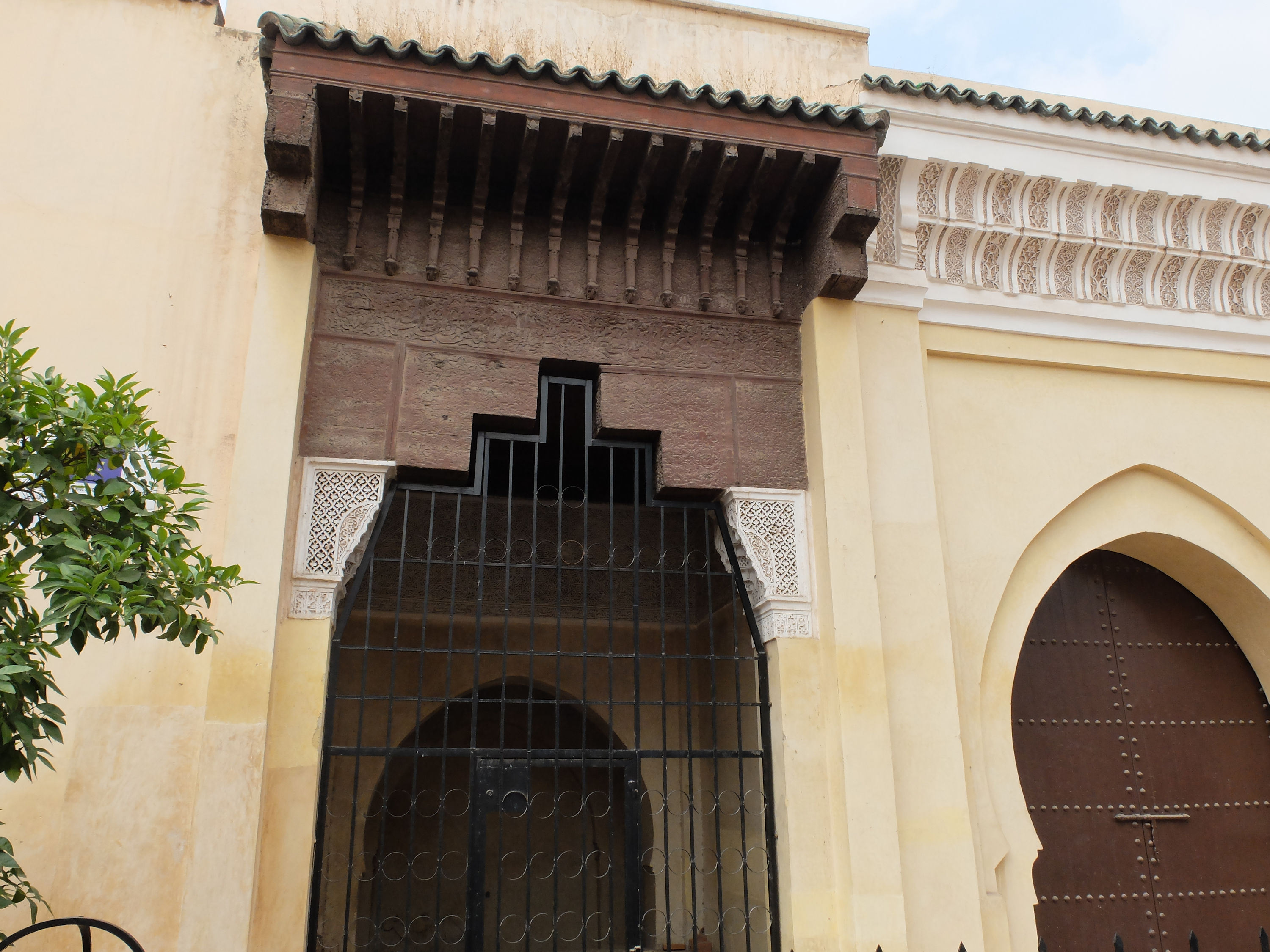
View of the street fountain in 2015

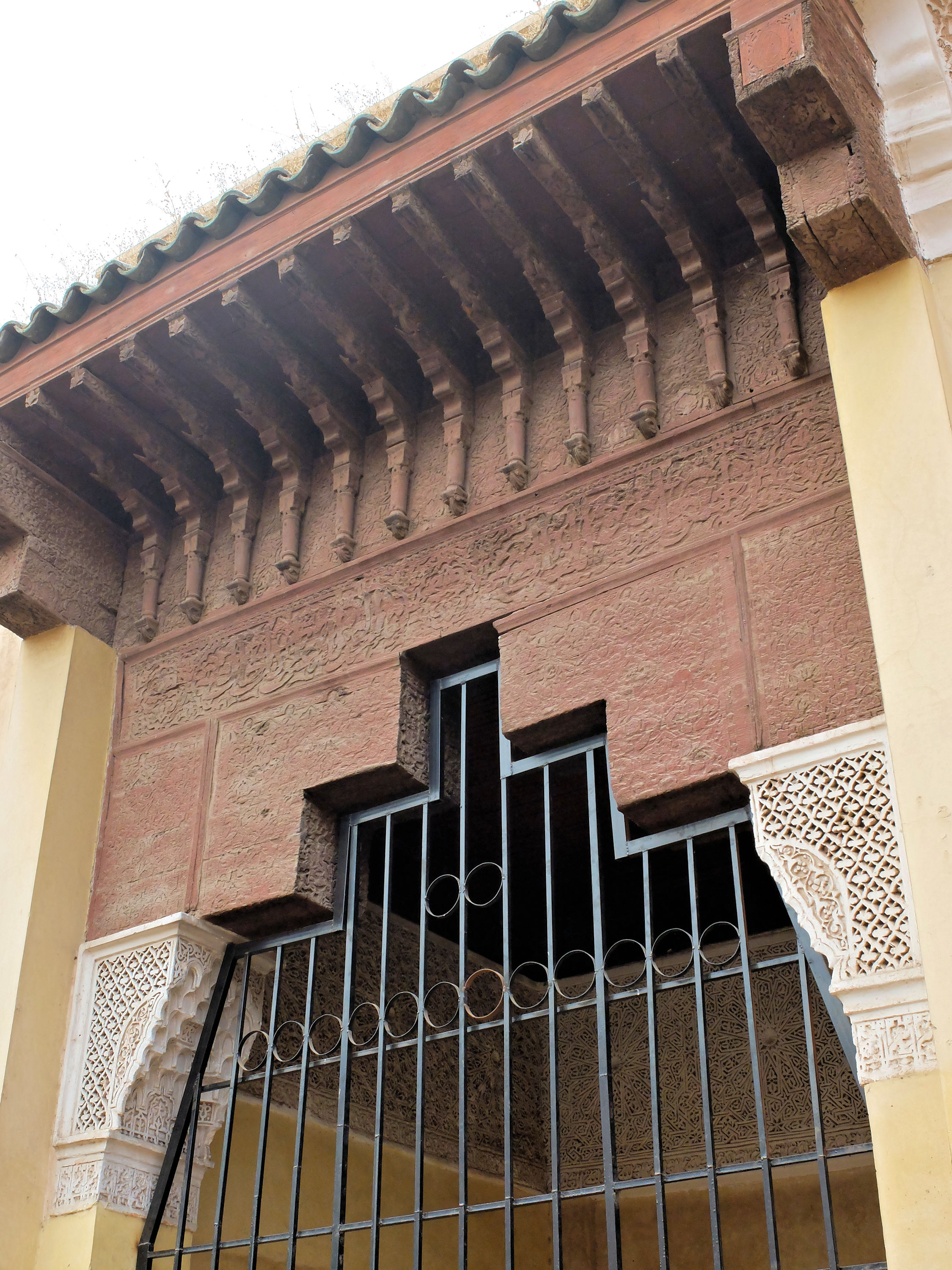
Closer view of the fountain's details

Like the Mouassine Mosque, the Bab Doukkala Mosque has an ablutions house (mida'a) included in a separate structure located on the northeast side of the mosque (across the street from the minaret). This structure consists of a rectangular courtyard occupied in its center by a large rectangular pavilion sheltering a long water basin which aided in the performance of ablutions (wudu) before prayer. Around the perimeter of the courtyard is a series of small rooms containing latrines. This architectural arrangement may have precedents as far back as the Almoravid period, seeing as the Qubba Ba'adiyin, a former ablutions kiosk for the Ben Youssef Mosque, has a very similar layout. The roofed pavilion over the courtyard's water basin is also notable for its wooden berchla or artesonado ceiling.

The mida'a structure also features a richly decorated street fountain on its exterior; a Saadian architectural tradition also seen in the Mouassine Fountain and the Shrob ou Shof Fountain (and again with precedents found in the Almoravid-era Ben Youssef complex). The fountain, adjoined to the mida'a's northeastern façade, consists of three arched bays in a row to the right, which contained water troughs for animals, and a fourth bay on the left which contained a water basin for humans. (A wooden bar across the fountain's opening traditionally prevented large animals from reaching the water intended for humans.) The facility thus provided water for the neighbourhood, an act of charity which had religious connotations as well. Only the fountain for humans features any decoration: the arch of the fountain is decorated with carved stucco consoles below a corbelled wood lintel above which is a wooden canopy. The current stucco consoles probably date from later restorations, but the wooden lintels above it are most likely original. They are made in cedar wood and carved with the same kind of ornamentation found in other fountains of the Saadian era. In addition to floral motifs, the top lintel is carved with an inscription in Thuluth script which reads (approximate translation): "The most beautiful words that have been said are: praise to God in all circumstances!"

The hammam (bathhouse) of the complex was another service rendered unto the neighbourhood's residents, allowing for the maintenance of personal hygiene and the accomplishment of the ghusl. It is located to the southeast of the mida'a, across the street. Like the Mouassine's hammam and other Moroccan hammams in general, it consists of a changing room (where guests first enter), followed by a cold room, a warm room, and a hot room. (Guests proceeded from the cold room into progressively hotter rooms, with steam intended to induce perspiration.) The steam rooms, which were constantly humid, are covered by brick domes protected with plaster but without decoration. The changing room, by contrast, was richly decorated. It consists of a square room with four pillars forming a slightly smaller square within it. The peripheral space around these pillars forms a narrow gallery covered by wooden ceilings and featuring a large frieze of stucco along its upper walls carved with 16-pointed star motifs. The four pillars uphold corbelled arches of wooden lintels (similar in concept to the street fountain) below a large square lantern ceiling covered by a wooden cupola. The wooden ceiling is another well-crafted berchla construction decorated with geometric coffering and carvings. The wooden lintels and corbels of the gallery arches are carved with low reliefs of vegetal arabesques and abstract calligraphic motifs. On the lower lintel, mixed in with the other motifs, are graceful Thuluth inscriptions (similar in style to the fountain's inscriptions) with praises to God and other blessings of health and prosperity. According to Xavier Salmon, the ornamentation in this room, which is more elaborate than that of the Mouassine hammam, is among the most superb examples of woodcarving from the Saadian period.

The mosque's former madrasa was attached to the east side of the building (or to the northwest corner of the building) but has not been preserved, and has since been replaced by newer structures. A small Qur'anic school for children, a msid, was also formerly attached on the east side of the fountain, in a room located on an upper floor reached by a steep staircase, but it too has disappeared. (The same feature has been preserved in the Mouassine Mosque complex, however.)

== See also ==
- List of mosques in Morocco
