= Mouassine Mosque =

Mosque in Marrakesh, Morocco

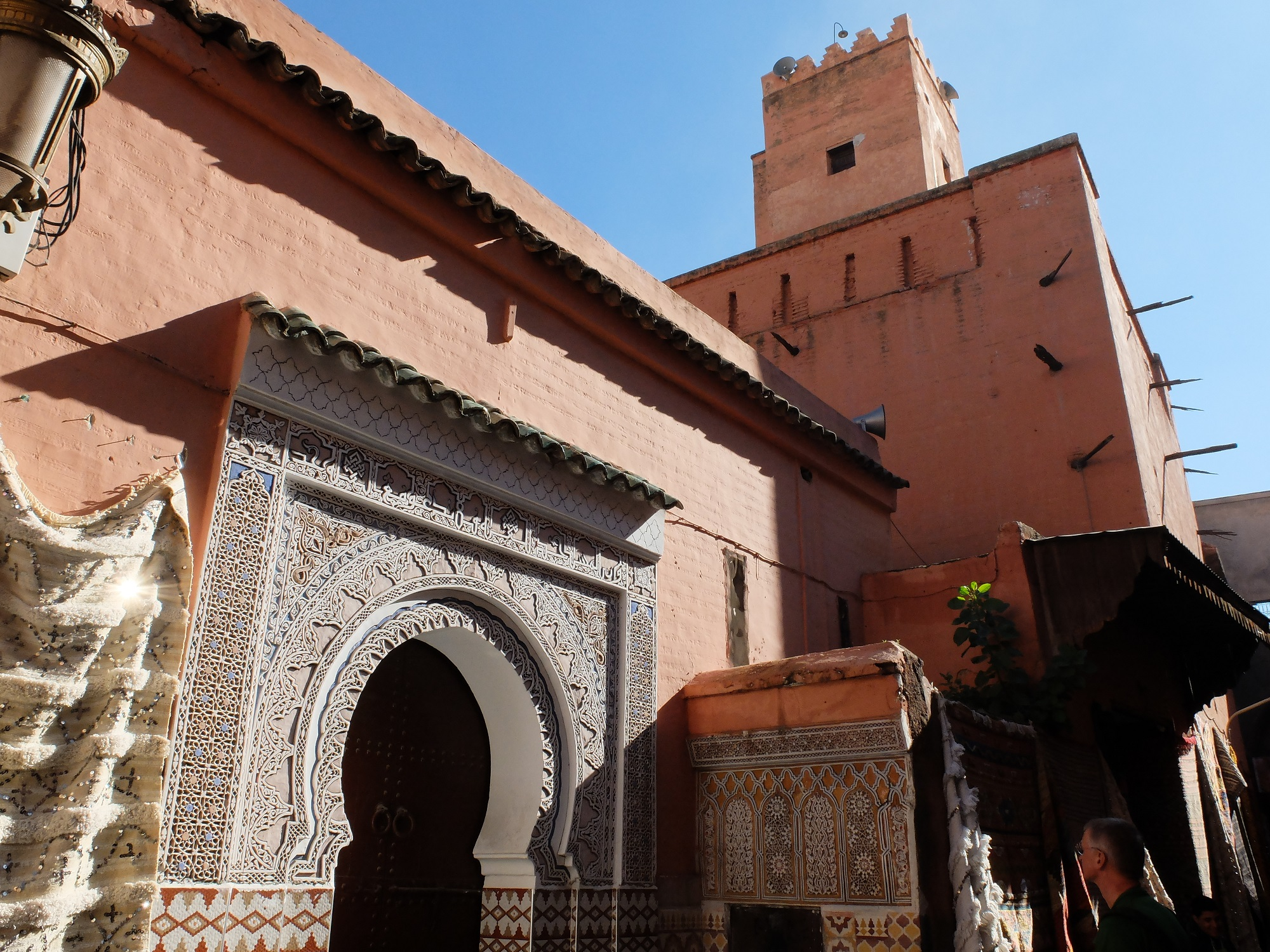
- Northwestern corner of the mosque, with its minaret (right)

Religion
- Affiliation: Sunni Islam
- Status: Active

Location
- Location: Marrakesh, Morocco
- Interactive map of Mouassine Mosque
- Coordinates: 31°37′46″N 7°59′22″W

Architecture
- Type: Mosque
- Style: Moorish (Saadian)
- Founder: Moulay Abdallah al-Ghalib
- Groundbreaking: 1562–63
- Completed: 1572–73

Specifications
- Minaret: 1
- Materials: brick, wood

The Mouassine Mosque or al-Muwassin Mosque (Arabic: جامع المواسين, romanized: jama' al-muwāssīn) is a major mosque in the Mouassine neighbourhood of Marrakesh, Morocco. It was built in the 16th century by order of the Saadian sultan Abdallah al-Ghalib. It was designed to serve as the Friday mosque of a newly redeveloped neighbourhood and formed the central element of a larger religious-charitable complex that also included a madrasa, a hammam, a library, and the Mouassine Fountain. The design of the mosque itself is typical of Moroccan architecture from this period except for its minaret, which is unusually short and simple.

== Name ==
The etymology of the name "Mouassine" (or muwāssīn) is uncertain. Historian Gaston Deverdun noted that the name was popularly attributed to a Sharifian family which supposedly lived in the district, which also explained why the mosque is also known by the name Jami' al-Ashraf ("Mosque of the Sharifs"). However, historians have not been able to establish a record of such a family in the area. Deverdun notes that another possibility is that the name derives from an Arabic word meaning "knife-makers" or "cutlers", denoting the former presence of craftsmen along the main street of the area when the Jewish community was established there. Iñigo Almela likewise cites this as the most plausible etymology, but notes that this is still debatable.

== Historical background ==
The mosque was commissioned by the Saadian sultan Moulay Abdallah al-Ghalib. Construction took place between 1562–63 CE (970 AH) and 1572–3 CE (980 AH). In 1557–58 CE the sultan had ordered that the Jewish population of the city relocate to an area closer to the Kasbah (royal citadel), resulting in the creation of a new Jewish mellah which continued to exist into modern times. Construction of the mellah was probably finished around 1562–63. Meanwhile, the emptying of the old Jewish neighbourhoods had liberated a large amount of space within the city which was open to redevelopment. The Mouassine Mosque, along with the Bab Doukkala Mosque whose construction began slightly earlier, appears to have been part of a larger plan to build new "model" neighbourhoods in this area and spur an urban renewal of Marrakesh. Like the Bab Doukkala Mosque, it was conceived as part of a coherent religious and civic complex which included, in addition to the mosque itself, a madrasa, a library, a primary school, a hammam (public bathhouse), an ablutions house (mida'a) with latrines, a water trough for animals, and a public fountain for distributing water to locals.

Although many Marinid-era mosques were also built with attached facilities, this type of grand architectural complex was unprecedented in Morocco and may have been influenced by the tradition of building such complexes in Mamluk Egypt and in the Ottoman Empire. Historian Gaston Deverdun suggested that Mamluk influence could have been transmitted thanks to pilgrims returning from the Hajj to Mecca via Mamluk Cairo. A more recent study by Iñigo Almela argues against direct Ottoman influence and in favor of more local influences from older religious complexes in Fez and Tlemcen.

The mosque was built on top of a former Jewish cemetery, which caused some Jewish inhabitants of the city to avoid walking near the mosque for fear of unknowingly walking over an impure space where bodies were buried. According to one historical source, some Muslim worshipers were also put off by this and avoided attending prayers at the mosque. The latter claim is not backed up by other historical chronicles, but may have a part in explaining why the mosque did not gain greater prominence as a major mosque of the city.

== Architecture and layout ==
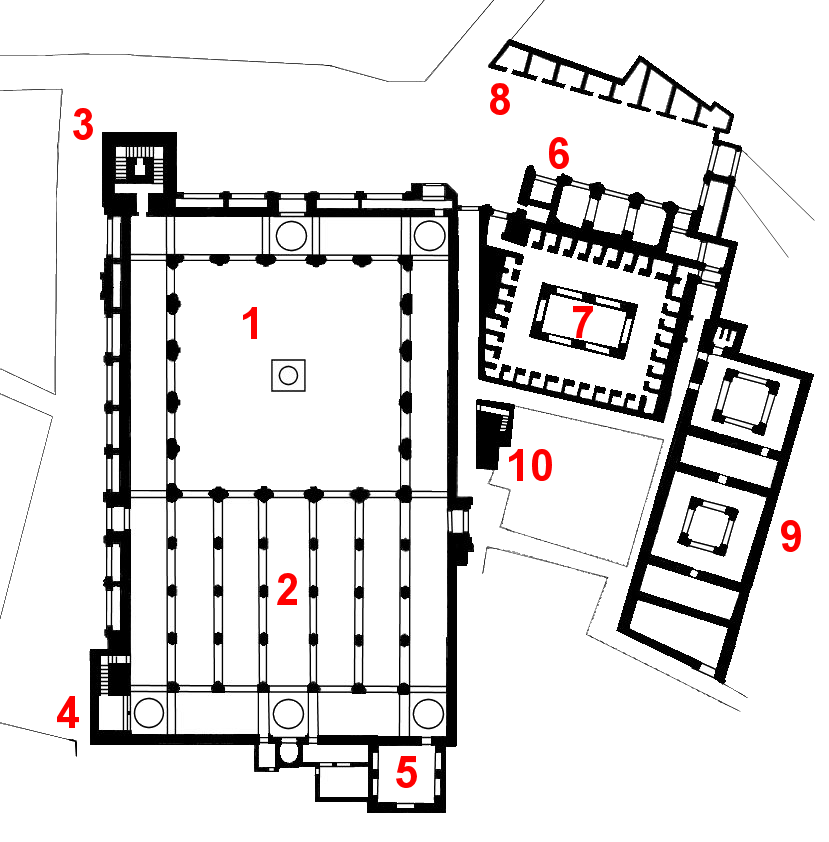
The floor plan (partly reconstructed) of the mosque and its annexes. The different elements include: 1) the sahn of the mosque, 2) the prayer hall, 3) the minaret, 4) the bayt al-'itikaf, 5) the library, 6) the Mouassine Fountain, 7) the mida'a (ablutions house), 8) the shops around Place Mouassine, 9) the hammam, and 10) the Qur'anic school.

The mosque is the largest component in a complex of adjoining structures which also include a mida'a (ablutions house), a hammam (public bathhouse), a library, a Qur'anic reading school for children, a madrasa (no longer extant), and, more famously, a public fountain alongside a drinking trough for animals.

=== Evolution of mosque architecture in Saadian period ===
As with the near-contemporary Bab Doukkala Mosque, the Mouassine Mosque generally follows the layout and form of the 12th-century Kutubiyya Mosque which, along with other Almohad mosques of that era, more or less set the style of Moroccan mosques. This layout is often referred to as the "T-plan" model, by which the aisle or nave leading towards the mihrab and the transverse aisle running along the mihrab or qibla wall of the mosque are larger or wider than the other aisles of the hypostyle prayer hall. Like in Almohad mosques, the principal decoration was concentrated around the mihrab area and along these emphasized aisles.

However, the courtyard (sahn) of the Saadian mosque was larger than in previous Almohad mosques, being nearly equal or even slightly larger than the interior prayer hall (unlike in Almohad mosques where the courtyards were proportionally much smaller). Additionally, the qibla orientation of the mosque (meant to be aligned with the direction of prayer) was shifted further east than before, closer to the "true" qibla (the direction of Mecca) and away from the predominantly southwards alignment of Almohad mosques. Both of these shifts had begun during the preceding Marinid era, but the Saadians took them further and, in the process, consolidated the form of Moroccan mosques thereafter.

=== The mosque ===
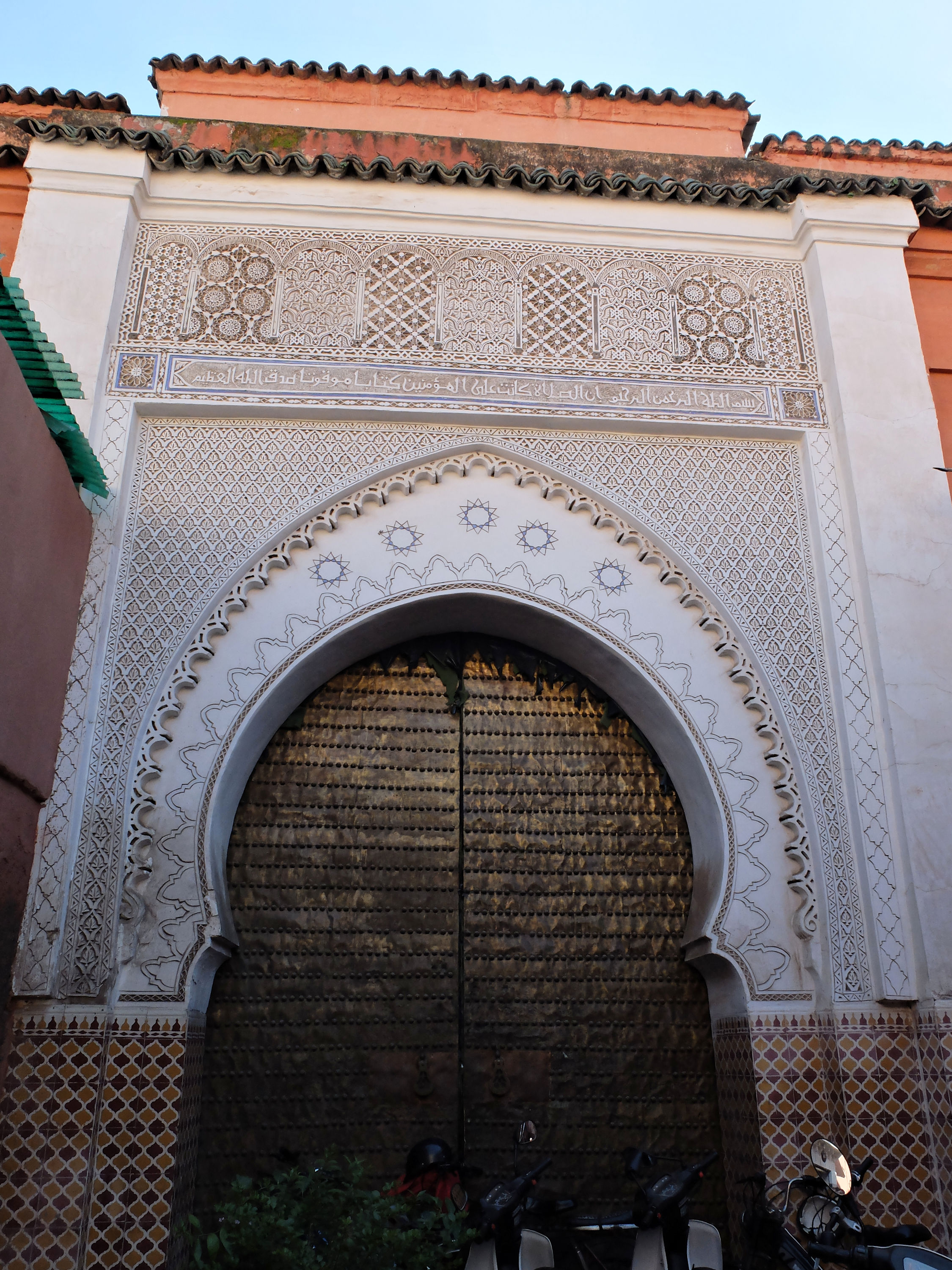
The northern entrance of the mosque.

The mosque has a large, nearly square courtyard (sahn) which occupied the northern half or so of the building while the southern section is occupied by the interior prayer hall. The courtyard is centered around a fountain and is surrounded on three sides by a gallery of arches, while the prayer hall on its south side is split into seven aisles by rows of arches. The arches are almost all of Moorish or horseshoe form, while bands or outlines of stucco decoration are carved around them or on the wall surfaces between them.

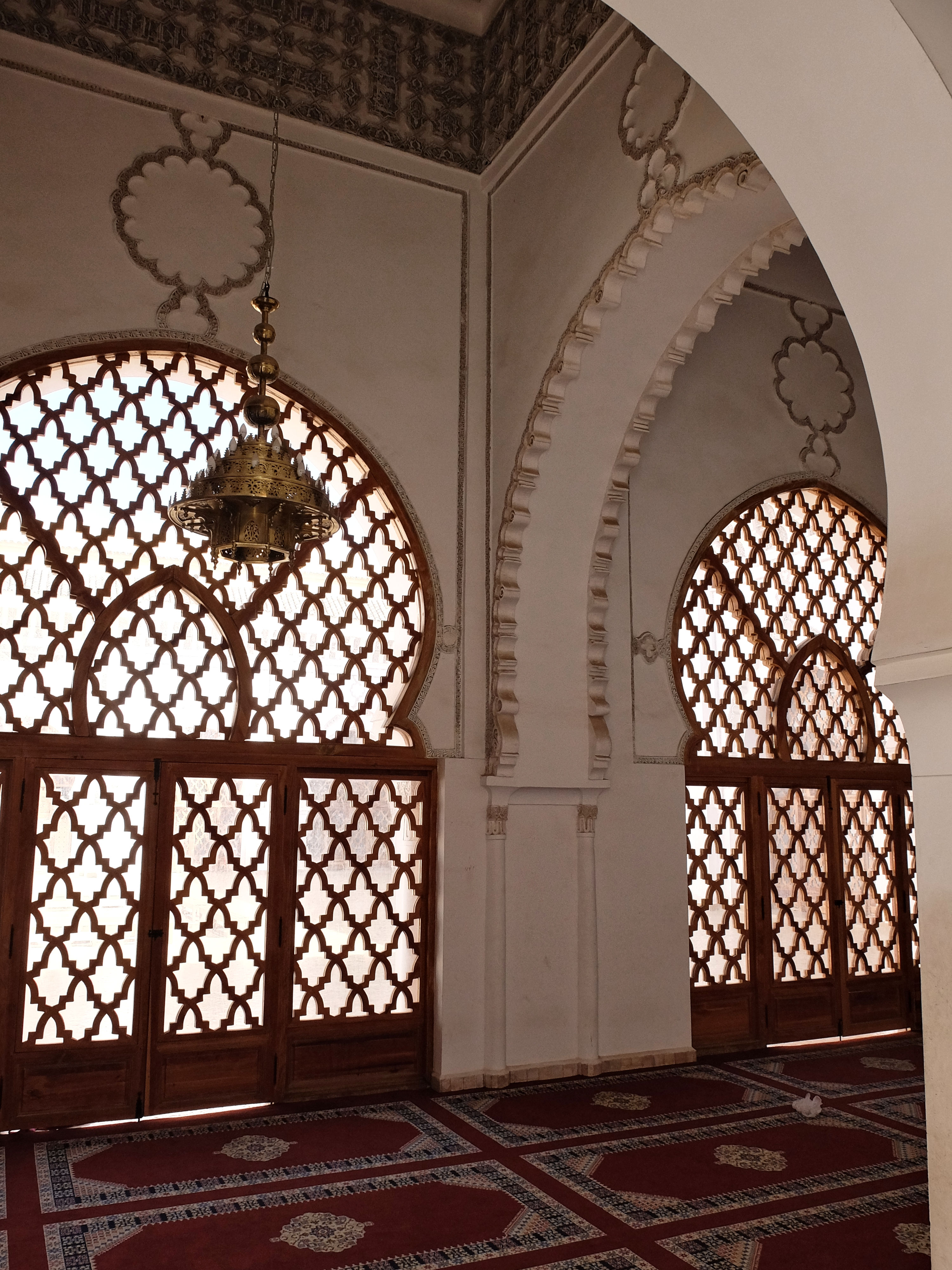
Interior of the mosque (inside the gallery on the north side of the courtyard)

The mosque has three main entrances: one to the north, aligned with the major central axis of the building, which opens into the courtyard, and two symmetrical side entrances to the west and east that open to the north edge of the prayer hall. The outer portals of the entrances are often highlighted with more stucco decoration, while the space just inside each entrance is covered by a cupola of muqarnas (stalactite-like sculpting). The central archway on the south side of the courtyard is covered in part by a wooden screen called the anaza which covers the entrance to the aisle leading to the central mihrab (niche symbolizing the direction of prayer) and also acts as an "auxiliary mihrab" for those carrying out their prayers in the courtyard.

The transverse aisle running along the qibla (southeastern) wall is demarcated from the rest of the prayer hall by another row of arches running perpendicular to the others, while the arches next to the mihrab have a "lambrequin" profile (a dented and lobed outline common in Moroccan and Moorish architecture) with muqarnas-carved intrados. The mihrab itself is an arched alcove with a small muqarnas cupola. The wall around it is covered in stucco-carved decoration featuring arabesque, geometric, and calligraphic motifs. The space between the arches in front of the mihrab is also covered above by a large square cupola of fine muqarnas. The lower part of the mihrab is also decorated by eight engaged columns in a symmetrical arrangement around the mihrab's opening. Unlike most earlier examples of this feature, which were often carved in stucco or plaster, the columns and their capitals here are made of marble. The surfaces of the columns are carved in arabesques and Arabic inscriptions, while the capitals are carved with ornate arabesques and muqarnas forms which are reminiscent of decorative Ottoman capitals of the era.

==== The minbar ====
The minbar (pulpit) of the mosque, kept next to the mihrab, follows in the artistic style and tradition of previous Almohad minbars and of the Almoravid-era Minbar of the Kutubiyya Mosque. Its form seems to be inspired in particular by the minbar of the Kasbah Mosque (a mosque which was also repaired and restored by Sultan Abdallah al-Ghalib). It is made of a combination of different-coloured woods including cedar and ebony, and its decoration mixes marquetry, ivory or bone inlay, and panels with sculpted reliefs to form both geometric and plant motifs. Scholars have argued that while the quality of its craftsmanship does not live up to its predecessors, it does show originality and a continued effort to adopt new forms into the decorative schema.

==== The minaret ====
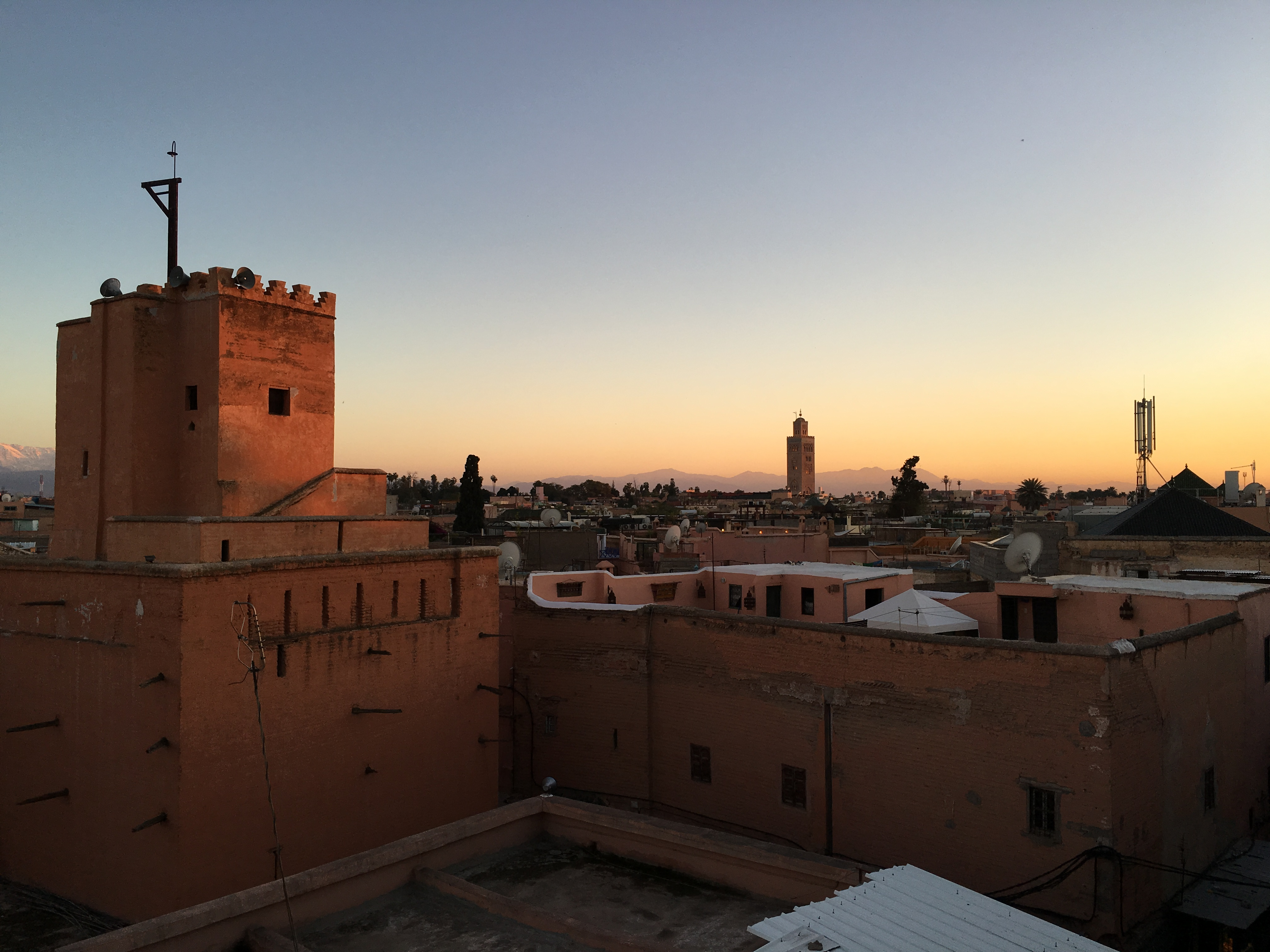
View of the minaret (left) from a nearby rooftop

The minaret of the mosque, located at its northwestern corner, is unusual for its short height (19.2 metres) and very simple form, in contrast with the ornate minarets of most royally-sponsored mosques in Morocco. This short and rudimentary form is a result of its unfinished construction. If its construction had been completed, it would have been one of the tallest minarets in the city. A popular explanation reported in tradition claims that the minaret was left this way due to the demands of a vizier who lived near the mosque at the time of its construction and who objected to a tower from which someone could have potentially seen inside the courtyards and rooms of his private residence and harem.

==== The library and the bayt al-'itikaf ====
The library is attached to the mosque's southeastern corner and is accessed from a doorway in that part of the mosque. The library, whose decoration dates from a 19th-century refurbishment, consists of a large square room measuring 7.65 metres per side. The room has five large niches with bookshelves surrounded by a band of epigraphic stucco decoration. By the mid-20th century the library was abandoned and no longer housed a collection.

At the southwestern corner of the mosque, extending from the southern transverse aisle of the prayer hall, is a room called the bayt al-'itikaf (Arabic: بيت الاعتكف) which served as a space for spiritual retreat. It is a richly decorated chamber accessed from a stairway, with a richly-painted wooden ceiling and a double-arched window, decorated with carved stucco, opening back onto the mosque.

=== Qur'anic school and madrasa ===
The mosque complex originally included a separate but nearby madrasa which had 28 rooms to lodge students. It was arranged around a small courtyard and its architecture was seemingly more modest than that of the famous Saadian-era Ben Youssef Madrasa. The madrasa was later replaced by a residence for women from the Saadian aristocracy.

Another school, devoted more strictly to learning the Qur'an and more akin to a primary school, was located next over the street right next to the eastern entrance of the mosque. It was referred to as a msid and also appeared to have served as a place to copy manuscripts. Still preserved today, it is located on an upper floor reached by a stairway and consists of a simple room which retains some fine stucco-carved decoration from the Saadian era. The room is partly divided by two dark marble columns with Saadian capitals carved with pine cone and palmette motifs. These in turn support consoles with arabesque and calligraphic stucco-carved decoration which support the ceiling. A frieze of more typical geometric and epigraphic decoration runs around the top of the walls of the room.

=== Hammam and ablutions house ===
The public fountain (last arch on the right) and drinking trough (three middle arches) attached to the ablutions house (mida'a) of the mosque. The hammam (bathhouse) is also accessed via the archway on the far left.

To the northwest of the mosque is the mida'a (Arabic: ميضأة) or ablutions house, which allowed for visitors to the mosque to wash their limbs and face in the performance of ritual ablutions (wudu) before prayers. It consisted of a courtyard building with an arched pavilion over a water basin in the middle. This layout is similar to that of the much older Almoravid Qubba which was itself an ablutions pavilion.

To the east of this structure is the hammam or bathhouse, which allowed members of the public to fully wash themselves (an act known as ghusl). It included a changing room and then a succession of cold, warm, and hot steam rooms, mostly vaulted in brick. Much of it has been restored or redone over the years such that not much of the original Saadian materials are still visible.

=== Mouassine Fountain ===
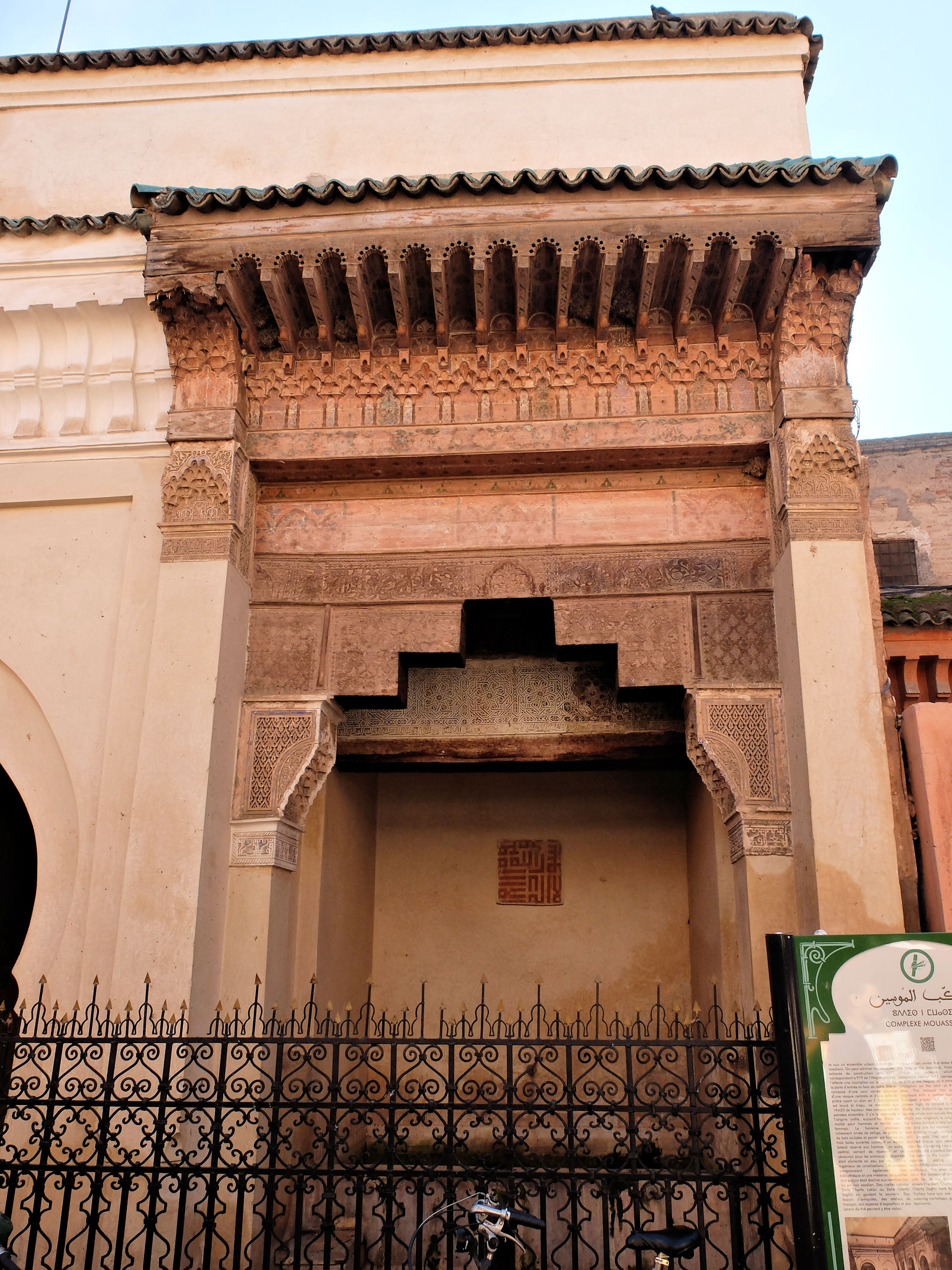
The Mouassine Fountain, with original carved cedar wood elements from the Saadian era and later decoration added or remade in the 19th century.

On the north side of the ablutions house and the hammam, facing the street, is an arched structure sheltering a fountain and drinking trough. It was attached to the ablutions house in order to take advantage of the same water system. The structure occupies a rectangular space measuring about 18.1 by 4.7 metres and is divided by arches into four bays. The first three vaulted bays on the left (to the east) are occupied by what was a drinking trough for animals, while the bay on the right harboured a public fountain for humans; a wooden bar across its opening prevented pack animals from reaching it. Yet another archway stands further left and east of this whole structure but serves to give access to the hammam, while two more arches, perpendicular to the others, enclose the east side of the small public square in front of the fountain, with one of the arches giving access to the market street beyond.

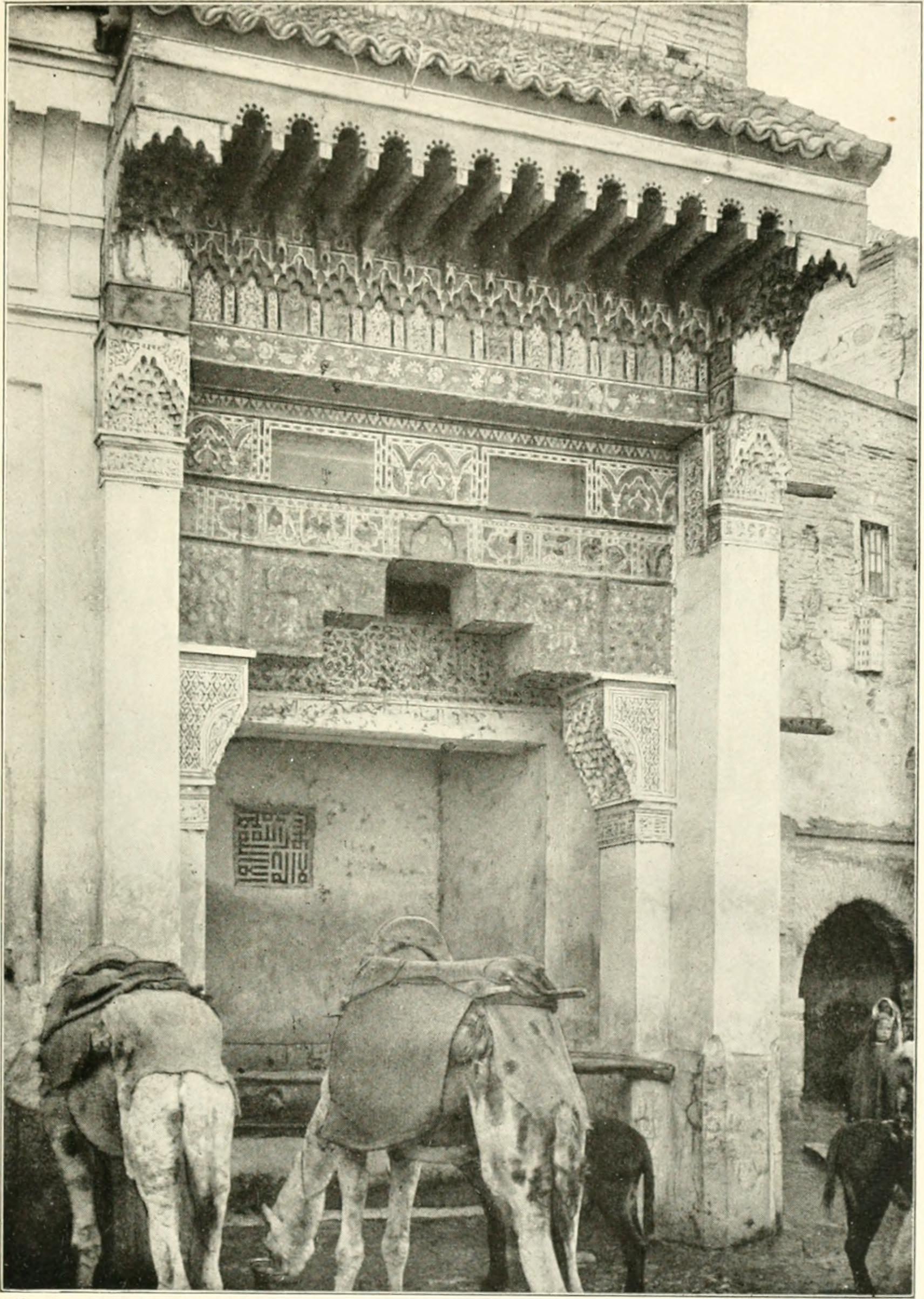
The Mouassine Fountain in 1920

While the arches of the drinking trough are plain, the archway and facade of the fountain are richly decorated and bear resemblances to both the fountain of the Bab Doukkala Mosque and the Saadian-era Shrob ou Shouf Fountain. The tradition of public water fountains was already an old tradition in Morocco, as well as in the wider Islamic world where fountains, bathhouses, and sabils were common urban public amenities, in large part due to Islamic tradition placing an emphasis on the availability of water as an essential act of public charity. The Mouassine Fountain is one of the most outstanding examples in Marrakech. It was heavily renovated around 1867, under the reign of Muhammad IV, when much of its decoration was redone or added, but many of its carved cedar wood elements are preserved from the original 16th-century construction.

The fountain's main arch consists of two lower corbels or consoles sculpted in plaster or stucco with muqarnas and other motifs, which in turn uphold step-like corbels made of cedar wood. Above these corbels is a cedarwood lintel and then several more horizontal bands with painted decoration (now partly faded), culminating in a wooden canopy with muqarnas and other carved elements typical of Moroccan architecture. The cedar wood corbels and the lower wooden lintel, all richly carved, are original elements from the Saadian era (16th century), while the plaster elements and painted decoration date from the 19th century. The wooden corbels are covered with sculpted motifs of palmettes, pine cones, and leaves, while the lower lintel bears an inscription in Thuluth script, interwoven with images of leaves and plant motifs, which reads (approximate translation): "The most beautiful words that have been said are: praise to God in all circumstances!" This verse is similarly found on the lintels of the Bab Doukkala Mosque fountain and the Shrob ou Shouf Fountain. Inside the fountain, behind the arch, is another lower lintel with decoration. Its lower edge used to be painted with an inscription in black letters on a light background, but this has faded away. Above it, and extending along the side walls as well, is a frieze of stucco carved with geometric star patterns. A square plaque or tile displaying the Shahada in Square Kufic was added on the back wall of the fountain sometime after 1905.

== See also ==
- Mouassine Museum
- Lists of mosques
- List of mosques in Africa
- List of mosques in Morocco
