= Ben Youssef Mosque =

Mosque in Marrakesh, Morocco

- مسجد ابن يوسف
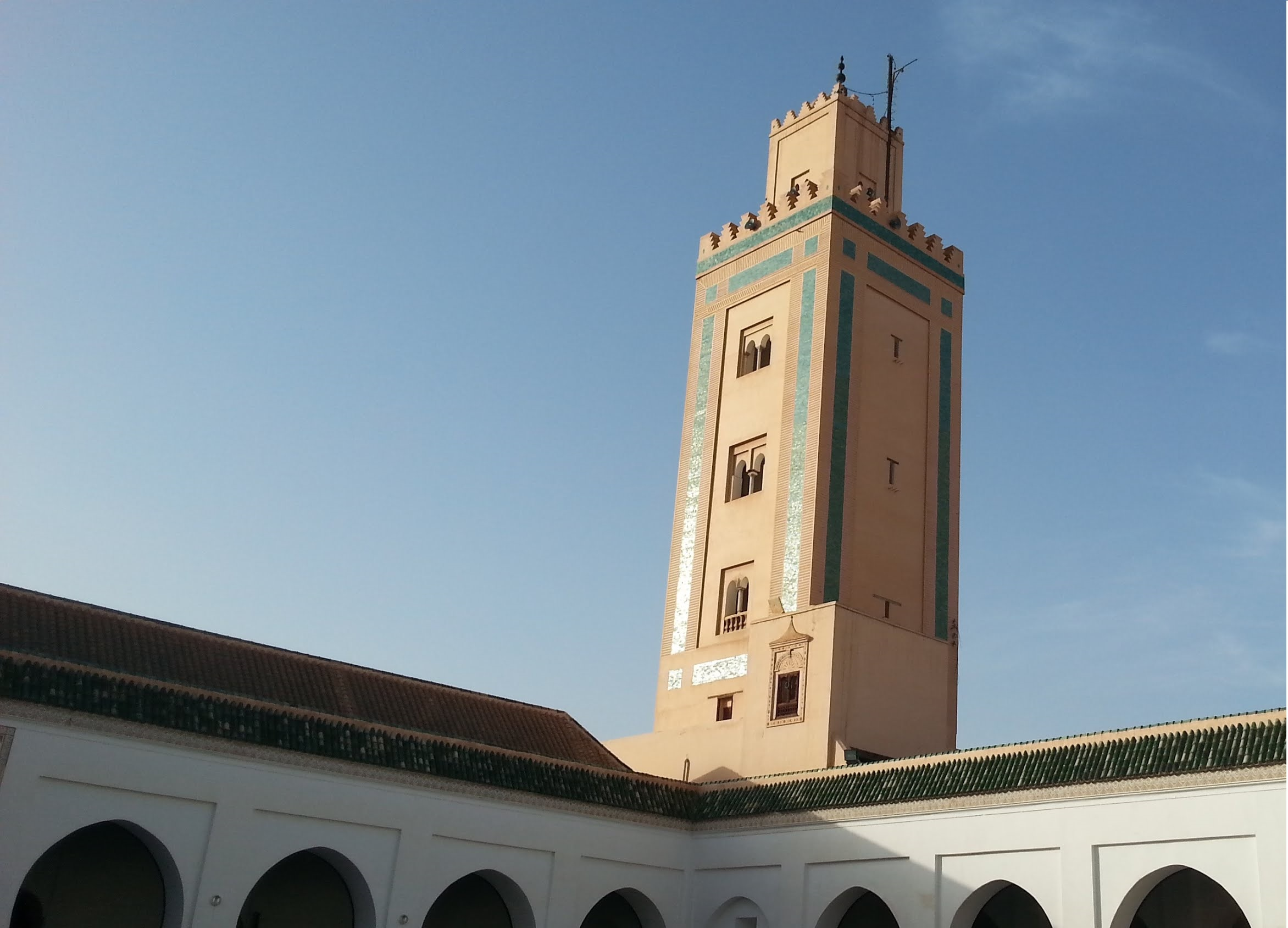

Religion
- Affiliation: Sunni Islam
- Status: active

Location
- Location: Marrakesh, Morocco
- Interactive map of Ben Youssef Mosque
- Coordinates: 31°37′54.93″N 7°59′13.78″W

Architecture
- Type: Mosque
- Style: Moorish (Alawi)
- Established: 11th or 12th century
- Completed: 1819–20 (current building)

Specifications
- Length: 64 metres (210 ft)
- Width: 64 metres (210 ft)
- Minaret: 1
- Minaret height: approx. 40 metres (130 ft)

The Ben Youssef Mosque or Ibn Yusuf Mosque (Arabic: مسجد ابن يوسف), is a mosque in the Medina quarter of Marrakesh, Morocco, named after the Almoravid ruler Ali ibn Yusuf. The mosque was originally founded in either the late 11th or early 12th century as the city's principal congregational mosque. Of the original Almoravid mosque almost nothing remains, except for the nearby Almoravid Qubba. The mosque was rebuilt and renovated at later periods and the current building dates from a reconstruction that was completed in 1819–20.

== History ==
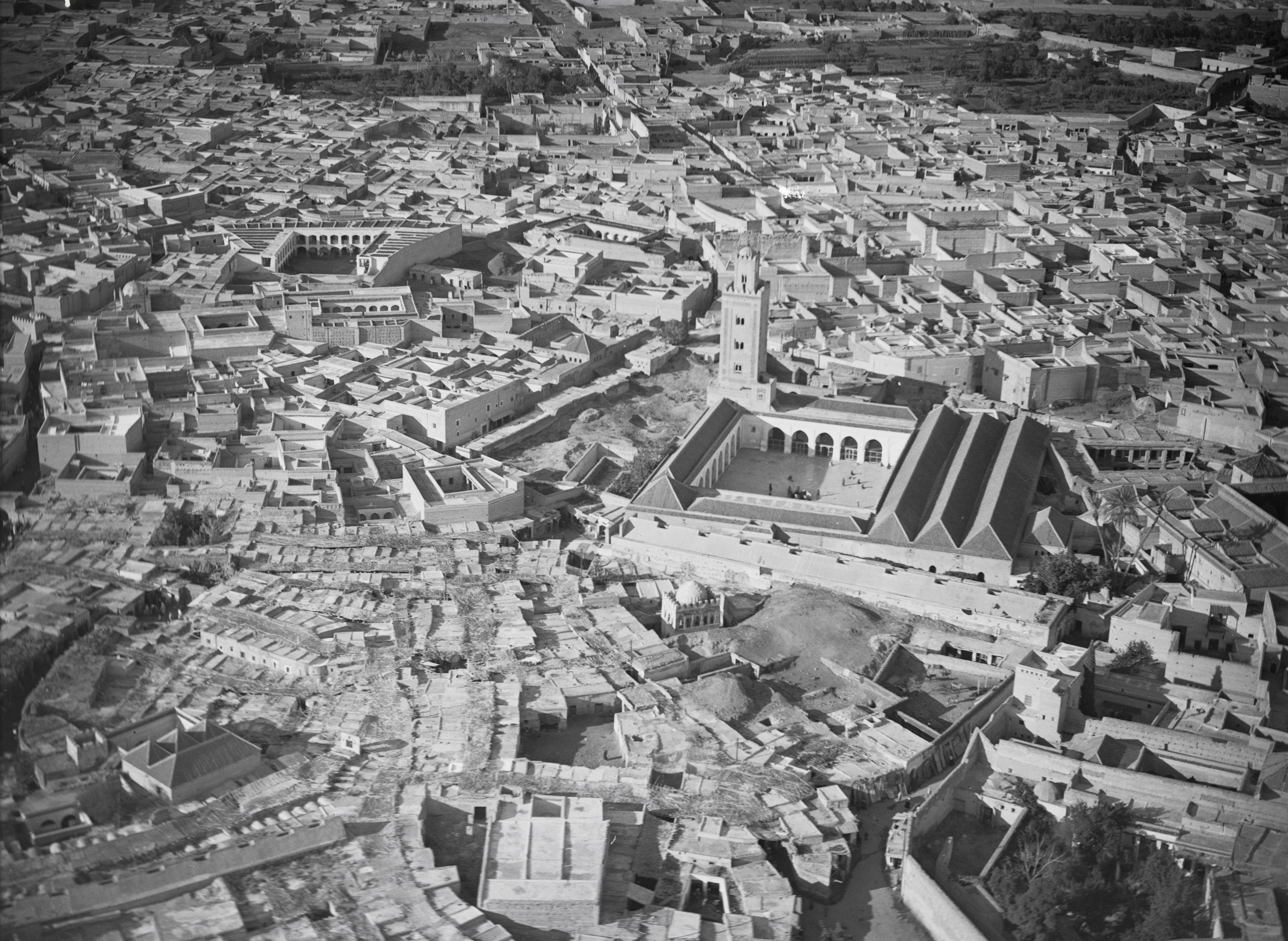
Aerial view of the Ben Youssef Mosque and its surroundings in 1930-1931

The first mosque in Marrakesh was erected by the Almoravid emir Yusuf ibn Tashfin soon after he arrived to take command of the city, in 1071, to serve as the central congregational mosque of the fledgling city. Nothing has survived of this first mosque and its exact location is not certain. It was built in rammed earth. Historical chronicles claim that Ibn Tashfin personally engaged himself in its construction, mixing the mortar with his own hands.

Ibn Tashfin's son and successor, Ali ibn Yusuf (or "Ben Youssef" from the French transliteration), built a grand new central mosque, named the Masjid al-Siqaya ("mosque of the fountain") on account of the large fountain with a marble basin in its courtyard. It cost nearly 60,000 gold dinars, and was completed sometime between 1120 and 1132. The minaret, which was probably one of the last elements constructed, was begun in 1129 and finished in 1132. It was the largest mosque built in the Almoravid empire, with a rectangular base of 120 by 80 metres (390 by 260 ft), and a minaret on its western side estimated to be 30 or 40 meters high. The rising city's layout was organized around it, and together with the neighboring souqs, it formed the center of early Marrakesh's city life. The nearby Qubba Ba'adiyyin (also known as the Almoravid Qubba) was most likely part of the mosque's ablutions facilities and is the only substantial remnant from the Almoravid era.

When the Almohads defeated the Almoravids and captured Marrakesh in April 1147, the Almohad caliph Abd al-Mu'min claimed that the Almoravid mosque had an orientation error and it was either demolished or abandoned. The Almohads instead built a new grand mosque, the Kutubiyya Mosque, in the southwestern parts of the city, far from the Ben Youssef Mosque, as well as another grand mosque, the Kasbah Mosque, to serve their new palaces in the south. The new Kutubiyya Mosque, however, was not entirely successful in displacing the center of urban activity away from the original city center.

During the Saadian dynasty period (16th century) the city underwent significant urban changes, with new neighbourhoods and new mosques being created in the western areas of the city (on the site of an older Jewish neighbourhood), such as the Mouassine Mosque. The Saadians appear to have also given their patronage to the neighbourhood around the Ben Youssef Mosque. The Ben Youssef Mosque was reportedly rebuilt or refurbished by sultan Abdallah al-Ghalib, who ruled between 1557 and 1574 (though no remains of this Saadian mosque have been found). Next to it, Abdallah al-Ghalib also erected in 1563–64 a new madrasa (theological college), the Ben Youssef Madrasa, just east of the mosque, thereby giving it a new life as the mosque of scholars. The ornate street fountain known as Shrob ou Shouf was also built nearby during the reign of Ahmad al-Mansur (r. 1578–1603).

Having fallen into ruin in the course of the seventeenth and eighteenth centuries, it was completely rebuilt in the early 19th century by the 'Alawi sultan Suleiman (r. 1792–1822), with a different alignment and hardly any trace left of its original Almoravid or Almohad design. Construction finished in 1819–20 when the minaret was completed. Despite this later patronage, the present mosque has retained the original name "Ben Youssef".

It continues to serve today as one of the most important mosques in Marrakesh. Traditionally, the qadi (religious judge) of the Ben Youssef Mosque has jurisdiction over all of Marrakesh, and even over outlying areas. It is not accessible to non-Muslim visitors.

== Description ==
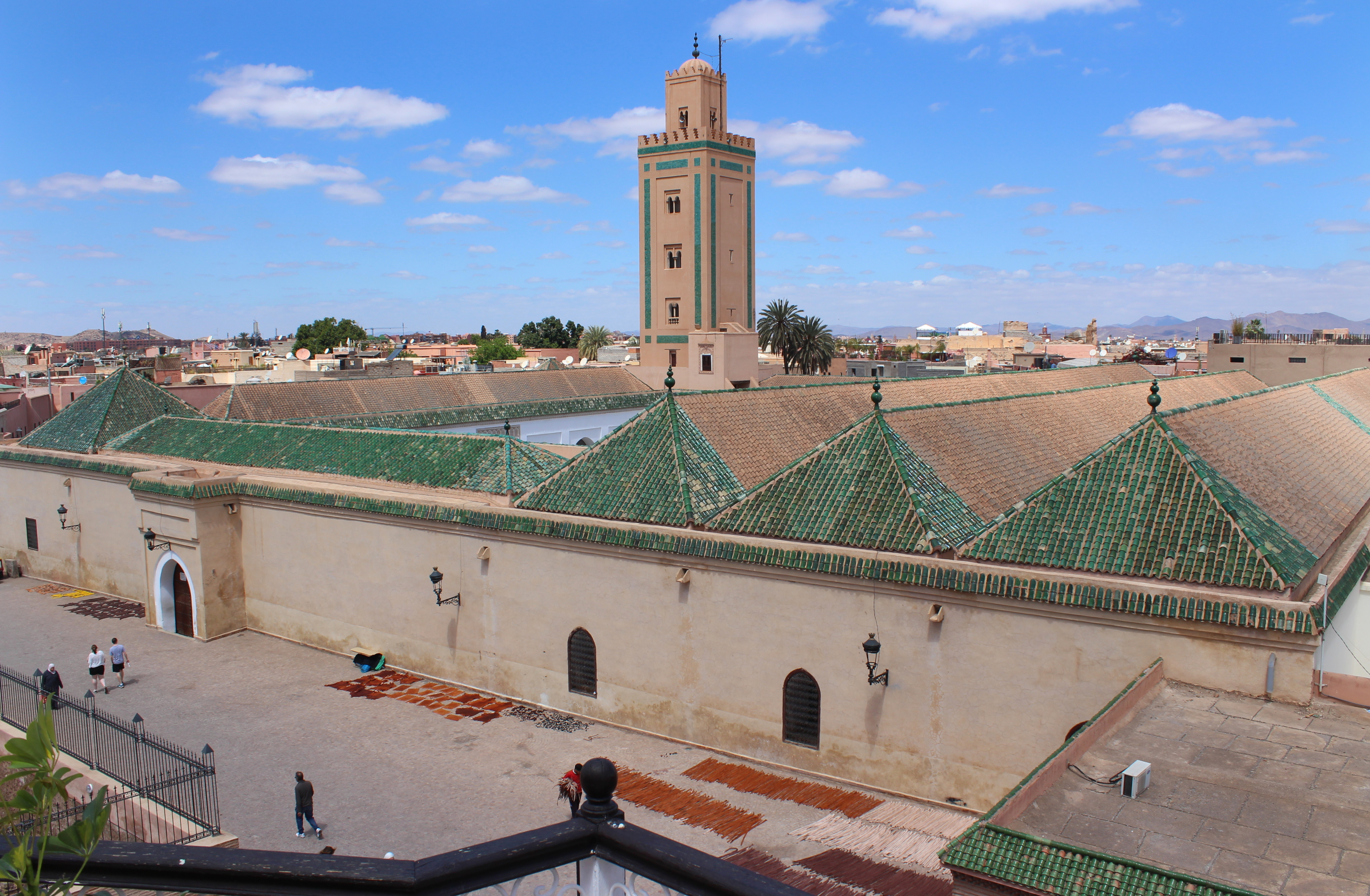
The mosque, seen from the southeast

The mosque has a square floor plan measuring 64 metres (210 ft) per side. It features a large internal courtyard (sahn), measuring 40 by 30 metres (131 by 98 ft), with a central fountain and surrounded by galleries to the north, south, and west. On the east side is the main hypostyle prayer hall, which is divided into three transverse aisles by two rows of arches running north-south, parallel with the far eastern qibla wall (the wall in the direction of prayer). The mosque's mihrab (niche in the eastern wall symbolizing the qibla) consists of the usual horseshoe arch opening into a small alcove, while the surfaces of the wall around the arch are covered in stucco carved with geometric, arabesque, and epigraphic decoration. The only other notable decoration in the mosque are the wooden ceilings, which have a typical sloped form with rafters but are enhanced with colorful painted geometric and arabesque motifs.

The minaret, located at the southwestern corner of the mosque, has a traditional form with a square base measuring 8 metres (26 ft) per side. It is around 40 metres (130 ft) high, with a main shaft topped by a much smaller second shaft, and features very little decoration apart from the two vertical bands of green tiling along the edges of each façade of the main shaft. Both tiers of the minaret are crowned with sawtooth-shaped merlons.

Because the mosque is smaller than the urban bloc it occupies (which corresponds to the outline of the original Almoravid mosque), it is entered via either of two passages that cross the distance between it and the street. The rest of the bloc around the mosque is occupied by a cemetery on its northwestern sides, and by various houses, annexes, and facilities around the rest of the perimeter. One of these annexes, at its southeastern corner, is the library (known as the Ben Youssef or Ibn Yusuf Library). Another structure, at the mosque's northeastern corner, is an aristocratic mansion, Dar Raghay, finished in 1943 on the site of earlier structures. It has recently been restored and converted into a cultural center known as Dar Bellarj.

== Legacy of the Almoravid mosque ==
The original outline and alignment of this grand mosque is still discernible in the layout of the streets today, as the streets immediately around the present-day mosque form a rectangle which is out of alignment with both the mosque and the later Ben Youssef Madrasa. This mismatch in alignment is due to the fact that the qibla (direction of prayer, with which mosques needed to be aligned) was estimated using different methods in different periods: while the present-day mosque (built in the 19th century) is oriented eastwards, the original mosque (12th century) was aligned slightly more to the south and the nearby Ben Youssef Madrasa (16th century) is oriented southeast. Archeological studies have identified remains of the Almoravid mosque's original minaret just northwest of the present-day mosque, giving some insight into its structure.

=== The Almoravid Koubba ===
The so-called Almoravid Koubba, also known as the Qubba Ba'adiyyin or Qubba Barudiyyin, is the only surviving example of Almoravid architecture in Marrakesh. It was built in either 1117 or, more likely, in 1125, by the Almoravid ruler Ali ibn Yusuf. Located just south of the Ben youssef Mosque today, most scholars believe that it belonged to the Almoravid mosque built by Ali Ibn Yusuf and that it was a pavilion used for ritual ablutions before prayer. This type of structure for providing water near a mosque was also known as a mida'a (Arabic: ميضأة; "ablutions facility") and is found in later mosques in Marrakech.

=== The Almoravid Minbar ===
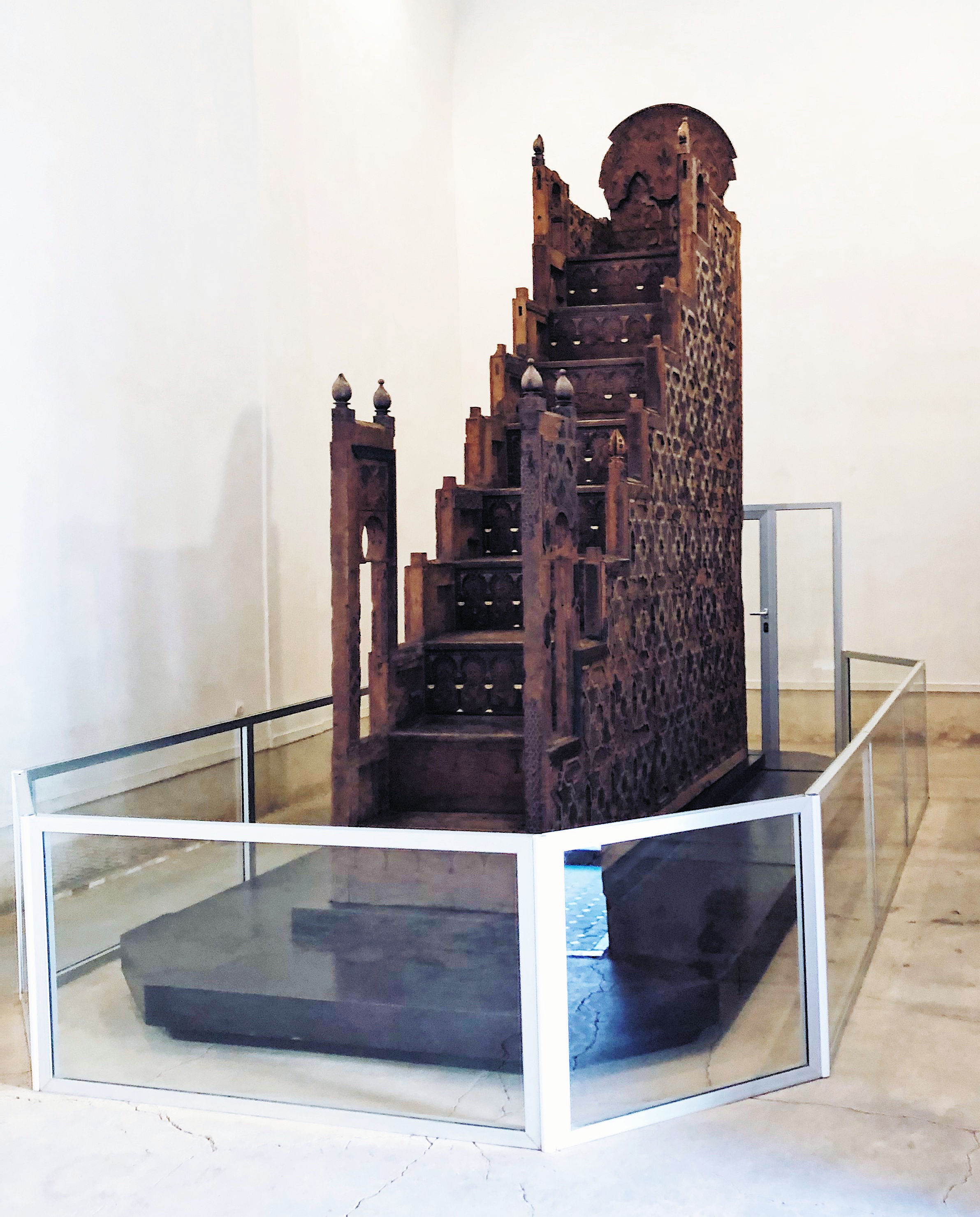
The Almoravid minbar, on display at the El Badi Palace

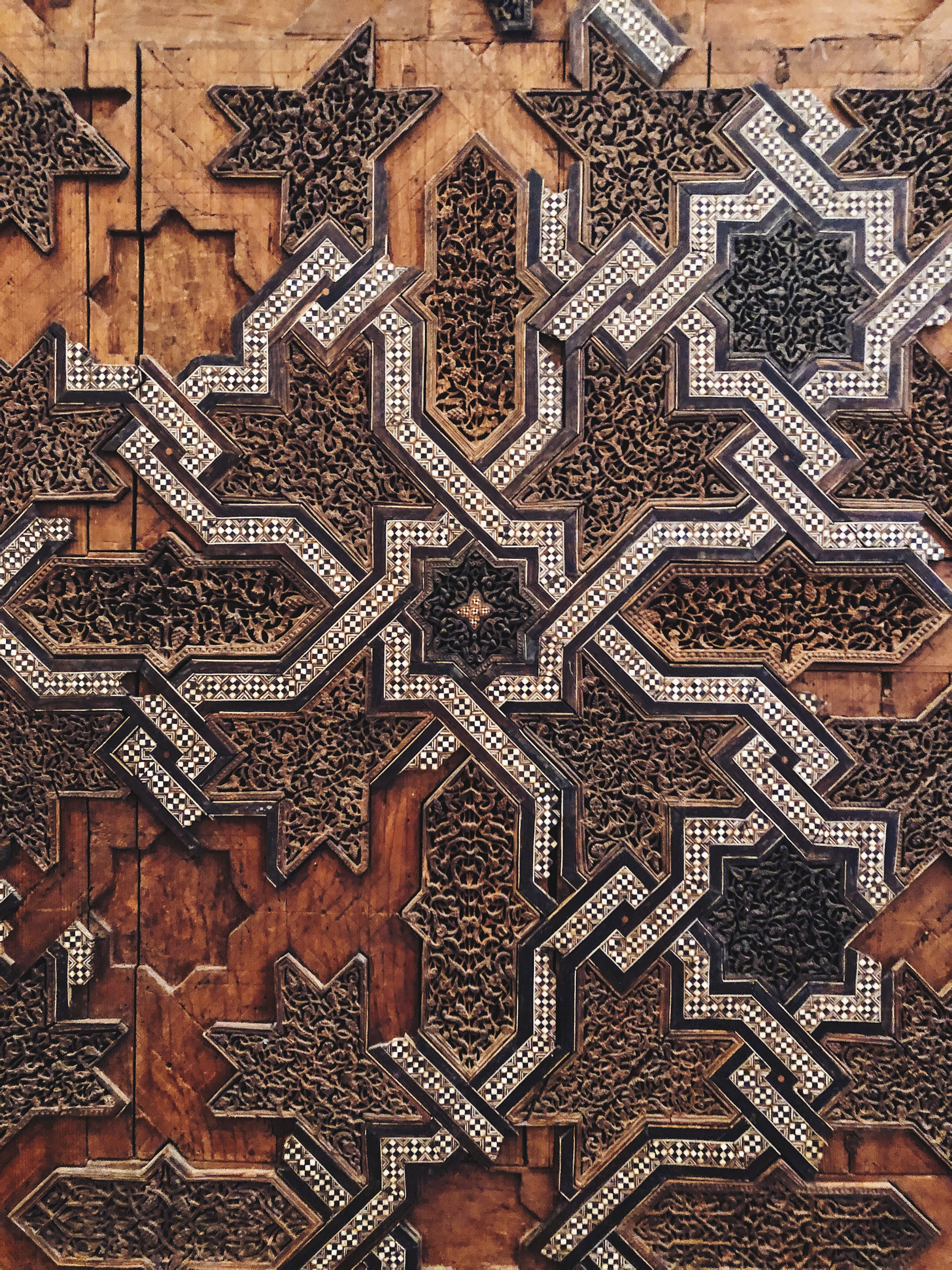
Detail of the geometric motif on the flanks of the minbar, centered around a recurring eight-pointed star. The spaces are filled with inlay and wood-carved arabesque pieces.

Ali ibn Yusuf famously commissioned an elaborate minbar (pulpit) for his mosque from a workshop in Cordoba, Spain (al-Andalus). Its production started in 1137 and is estimated to have taken seven years. It is regarded as "one of the unsurpassed creations of Islamic art". Its artistic style and quality was hugely influential and set a standard which was repeatedly imitated, but never surpassed, in subsequent minbars across Morocco and parts of Algeria. It is believed that the minbar was originally placed in the Ben Youssef Mosque at the time. However, it was later transferred by the Almohad ruler Abd al-Mu'min to the first Kutubiyya Mosque and was later moved to the second incarnation of that mosque. For this reason, it is often referred to as the Kutubiyya Minbar or the Minbar of the Kutubiyya Mosque. It remained there until 1962, when it was moved to the El Badi Palace where it is now on display for visitors.

The minbar is an essentially triangular structure with the hypotenuse side occupied by a staircase with nine steps. It is 3.46 metres (11.4 ft) long, 0.87 metres (2 ft 10 in) wide, and 3.86 metres (12.7 ft) tall. The main structure is made in North African cedar wood, although the steps were made of walnut tree wood and the minbar's base was made with fir tree wood. The surfaces are decorated through a mix of marquetry and inlaid sculpted pieces. The large triangular faces of the minbar on either side are covered in an elaborate and creative motif centered around eight-pointed stars, from which decorative bands with ivory inlay then interweave and repeat the same pattern across the rest of the surface. The spaces between these bands form other geometric shapes which are filled with panels of deeply carved arabesques, made from different coloured woods (boxwood, jujube, and blackwood). There is a 6 centimetres (2.4 in) wide band of Quranic inscriptions in Kufic script on blackwood and bone running along the top edge of the balustrades. The other surfaces of the minbar feature a variety of other motifs. Notably, the steps of the minbar are decorated with images of an arcade of horseshoe arches inside which are curving plant motifs, all made entirely in marquetry with different colored woods.

== See also ==
- Lists of mosques
- List of mosques in Africa
- List of mosques in Morocco
