= Ben Youssef Madrasa =

Madrasa in Marrakesh, Morocco

- مدرسة ابن يوسف
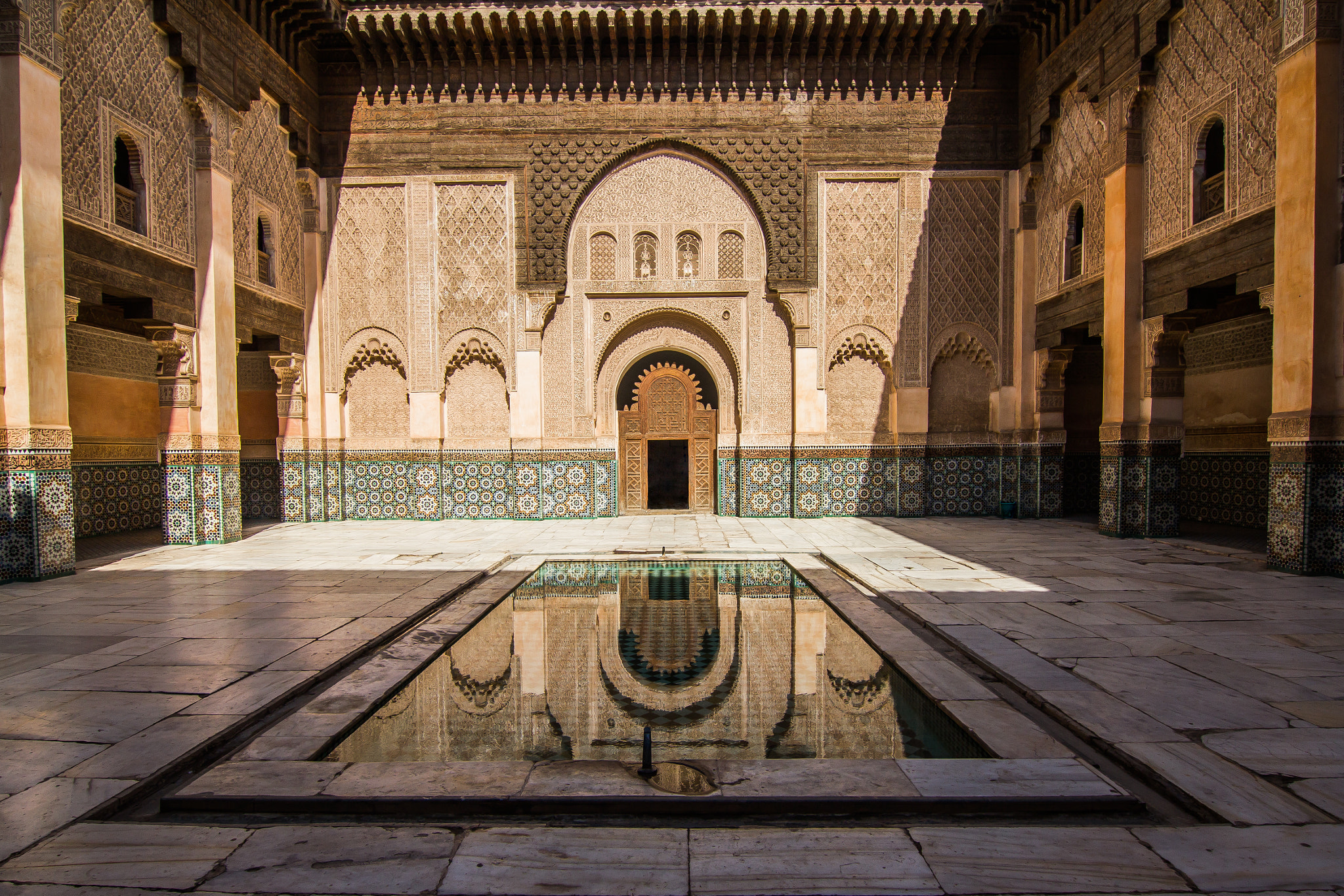
- The main courtyard of the madrasa and its reflective pool

General information
- Type: madrasa
- Architectural style: Moorish (Saadian)
- Location: Marrakesh, Morocco
- Coordinates: 31°37′55″N 7°59′10.3″W
- Completed: 1564–65

Dimensions
- Other dimensions: 40 m × 43 m (131 ft × 141 ft)

Technical details
- Material: cedar wood, brick, stucco, tile
- Floor count: 2

Website
- https://www.medersabenyoussef.ma

The Ben Youssef Madrasa (Arabic: مدرسة ابن يوسف; also transliterated as Bin Yusuf or Ibn Yusuf Madrasa) is an Islamic madrasa (college) in Marrakesh, Morocco. The madrasa is named after the adjacent Ben Youssef Mosque, and was commissioned in 1564–65 CE by the Saadian sultan Abdallah al-Ghalib. Functioning today as a historical site, the Ben Youssef Madrasa was the largest Islamic college in the Maghreb at its height, and is widely recognized as a pinnacle of Saadian and Moroccan architecture.

== History ==
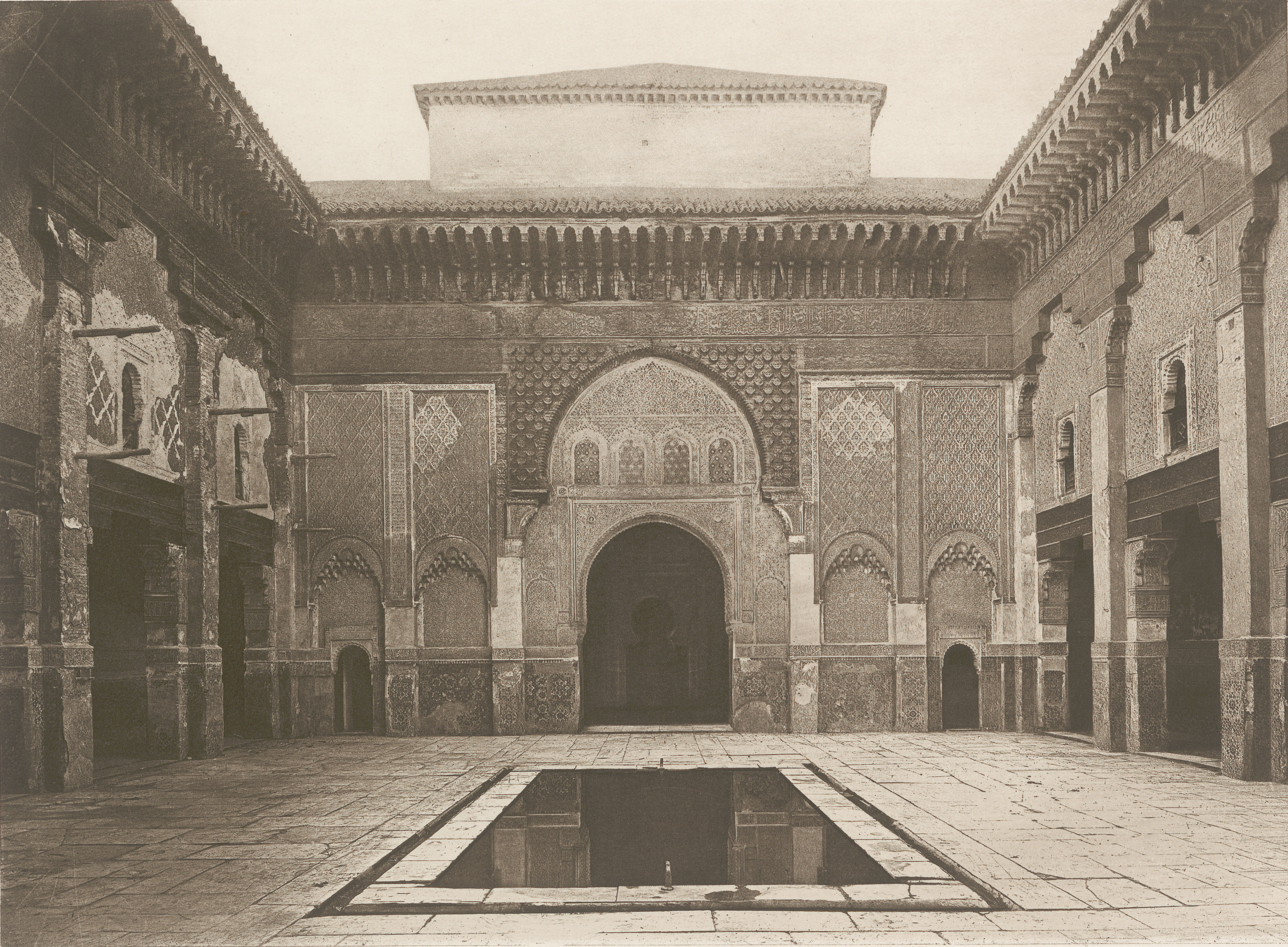
Courtyard of the madrasa in 1921

The madrasa is named after the adjacent Ben Youssef Mosque, which was originally the main mosque of the city, founded by the Almoravid Sultan Ali ibn Yusuf (r. 1106–1142 CE).

According to historical sources, in particular al-Ifrani, the first madrasa on this site was founded during the Marinid dynasty by Sultan Abu al-Hasan (r. 1331–1348). This dynasty, known for its perpetuation of the arts and literature, ruled from Fez during the 13th to 15th centuries and was responsible for constructing many madrasas across Morocco. Historically, madrasas in the Maghreb served to train ulama (Islamic scholars) in Maliki Islamic law, jurisprudence (fiqh), and variant readings (Qira'at) of the Qur'an.

The Saadian dynasty, which enjoyed the status of sharifs (descendants of Muhammad), was less dependent on the construction of madrasas to sustain their legitimacy and the support of the ulama than their Marinid predecessors. Nonetheless, they built many new monuments, including madrasas, in their capital of Marrakesh.

The Ben Youssef Madrasa was constructed by the Saadian sultan Abdallah al-Ghalib (r. 1557–1574 CE), a major builder of his period. Its construction probably began soon after he assumed power. It was completed in 1564–1565 CE (972 AH), as recorded by an inscription, following a style established during the earlier Marinid period. Once finished, it was the largest madrasa in the Maghreb. It was reportedly able to accommodate upwards of 800 students.

Closed down in 1960, the building was refurbished and reopened to the public as a historical site in 1982. The Ben Youssef Madrasa currently attracts thousands of tourists every year and remains one of the most important historical buildings in Marrakesh. It closed for restoration again in November 2018 and reopened to the public in April 2022.

== Architecture ==
=== Layout ===
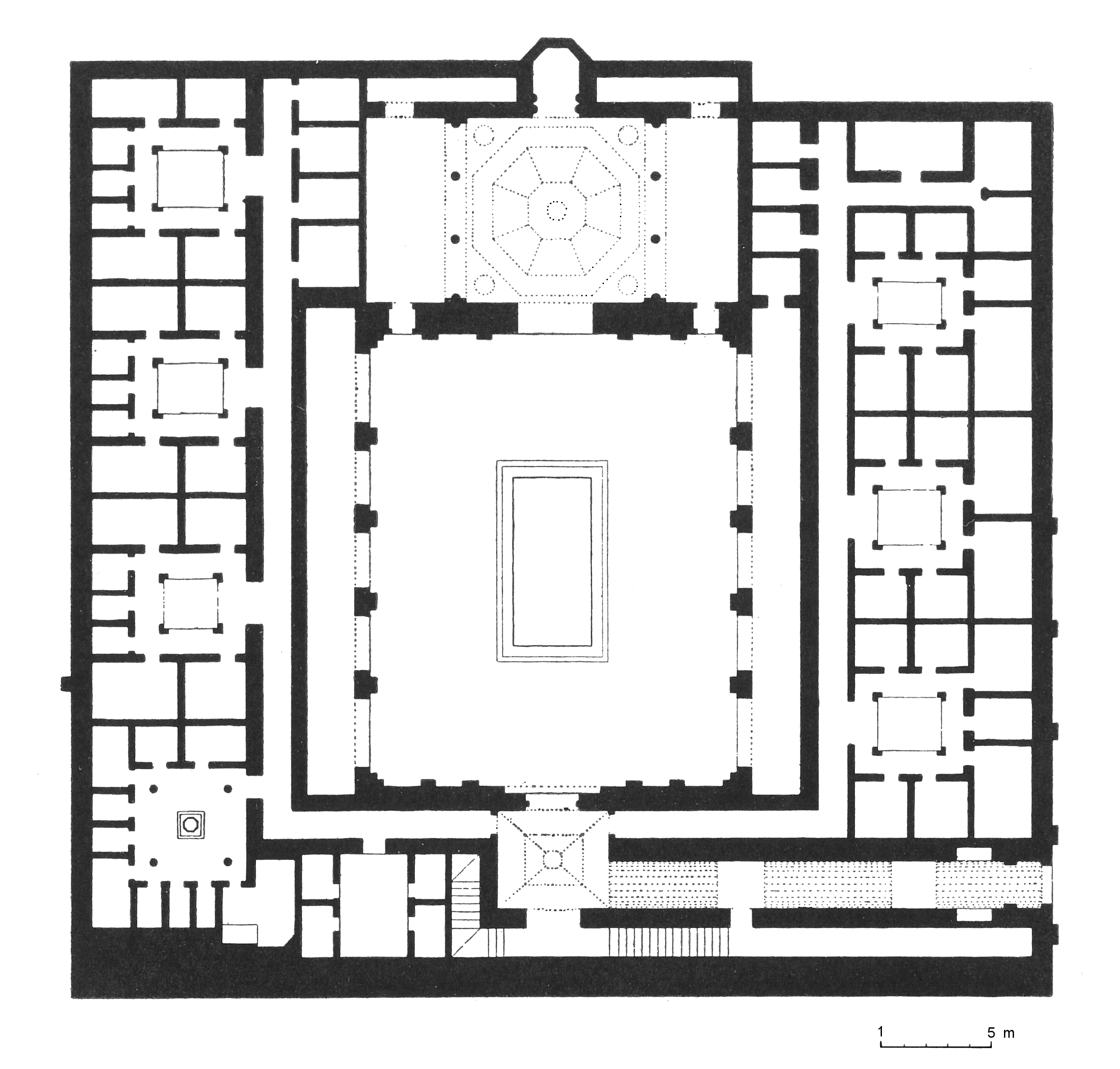
Floor plan of the madrasa (ground floor)

The madrasa's floor plan occupies a nearly square space measuring approximately 40 by 43 meters. The building is entered from a single street entrance, in front of which is a square vault sculpted with muqarnas. From the doorway, a narrow corridor leads to a vestibule chamber that gives access on one side to the central courtyard. This process of entry, like in many Islamic buildings, is carefully designed to inspire revelation and astonishment in an unexpected opening of space into the main courtyard. The layout of the building centers around the main courtyard, which is surrounded by east and west galleries and student dormitories on the upper and lower levels. Like many Islamic buildings, the courtyard is itself centered around a large, shallow reflective pool, measuring approximately 3 by 7 meters. At the southeastern end of the courtyard is another large chamber, which served as a prayer hall, equipped with a mihrab (niche symbolizing the direction of prayer) featuring especially rich stucco decoration.

As in classic Marinid madrasas constructed during the 14th century, the layout of the Ben Youssef madrasa contains student dormitory cells clustered around the first and second levels of the central courtyard. The madrasa's vestibule chamber gives access to two secondary corridors that circulate around the courtyard to give access to the dormitories on the ground floor, while two stairways from the vestibule give access to similar corridors on the second level. The dorm rooms are additionally arranged around a series of six small courtyards (three in the northeast wing, three in the southwest wing) that open on both levels from these corridors. Together, the madrasa consisted of 130 student rooms and housed up to 800 students, making it the largest madrasa in Morocco.

On the ground floor, the eastern corridor from the vestibule also gives access to an ablutions chamber in the northeastern corner of the building. The chamber has a square floor plan with four marble columns upholding four arches below a central cupola of muqarnas (similar to the one in front of the madrasa's entrance). The middle of the chamber is occupied by a square water basin, while a series of latrine rooms are accessible around the chamber's perimeter. Notably, it was also in this chamber that an 11th-century marble basin from Cordoba was first noted by Jean Gallotti (a historical arts inspector working for the French Protectorate) in 1921.

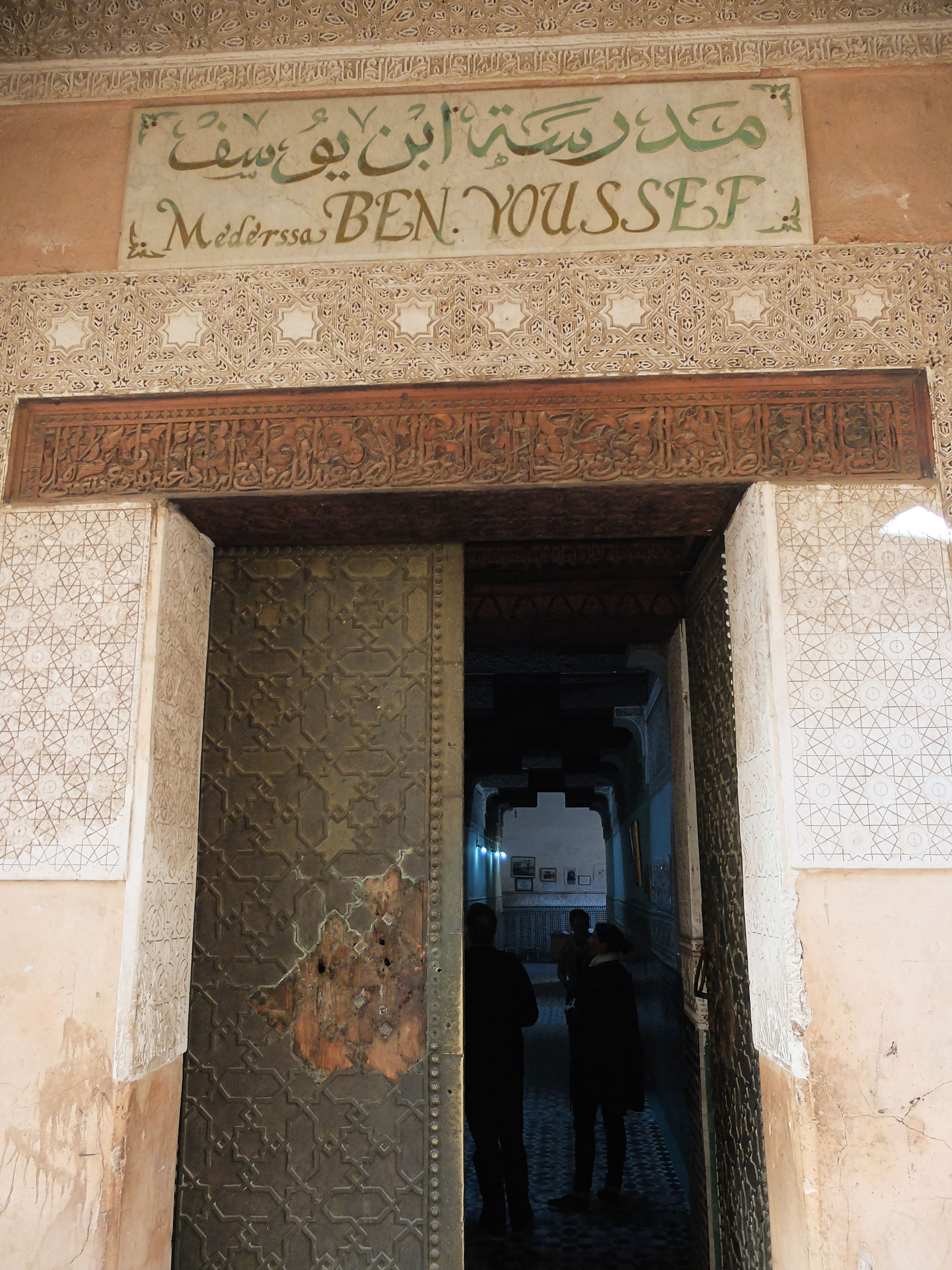
Street entrance of the madrasa today

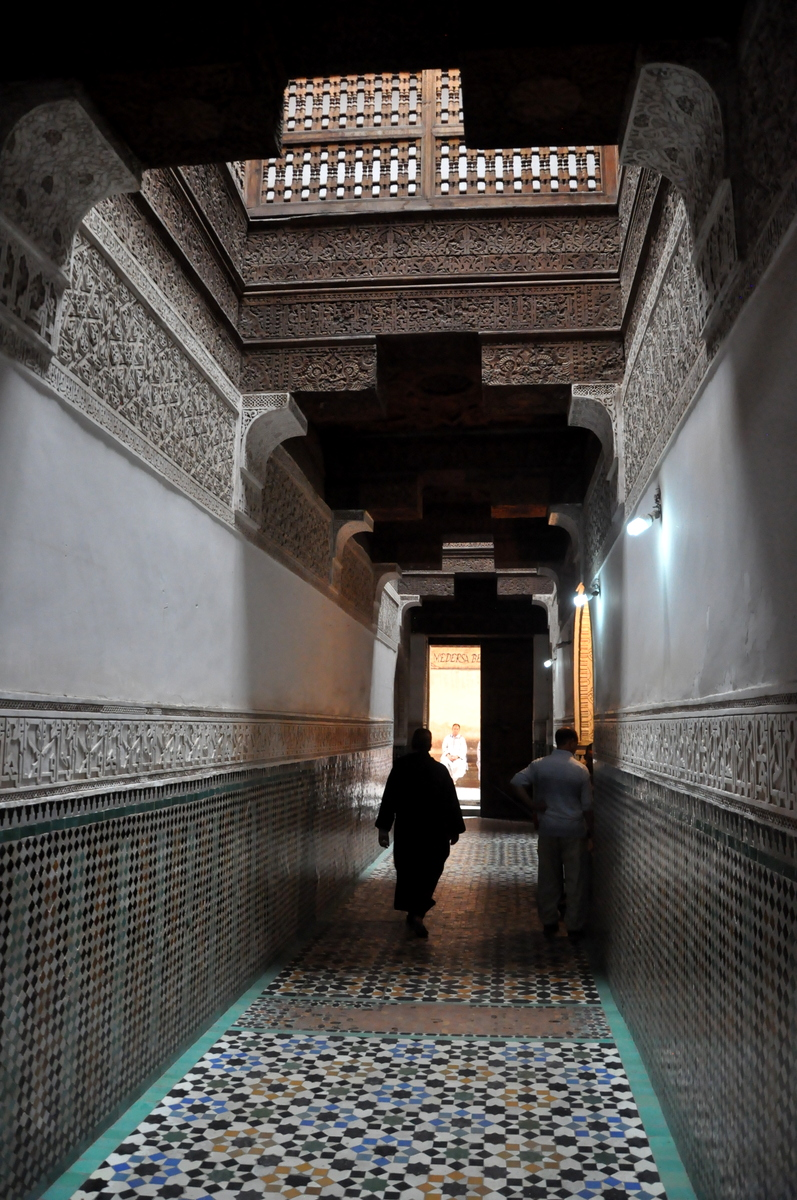
Entrance corridor of the madrasa

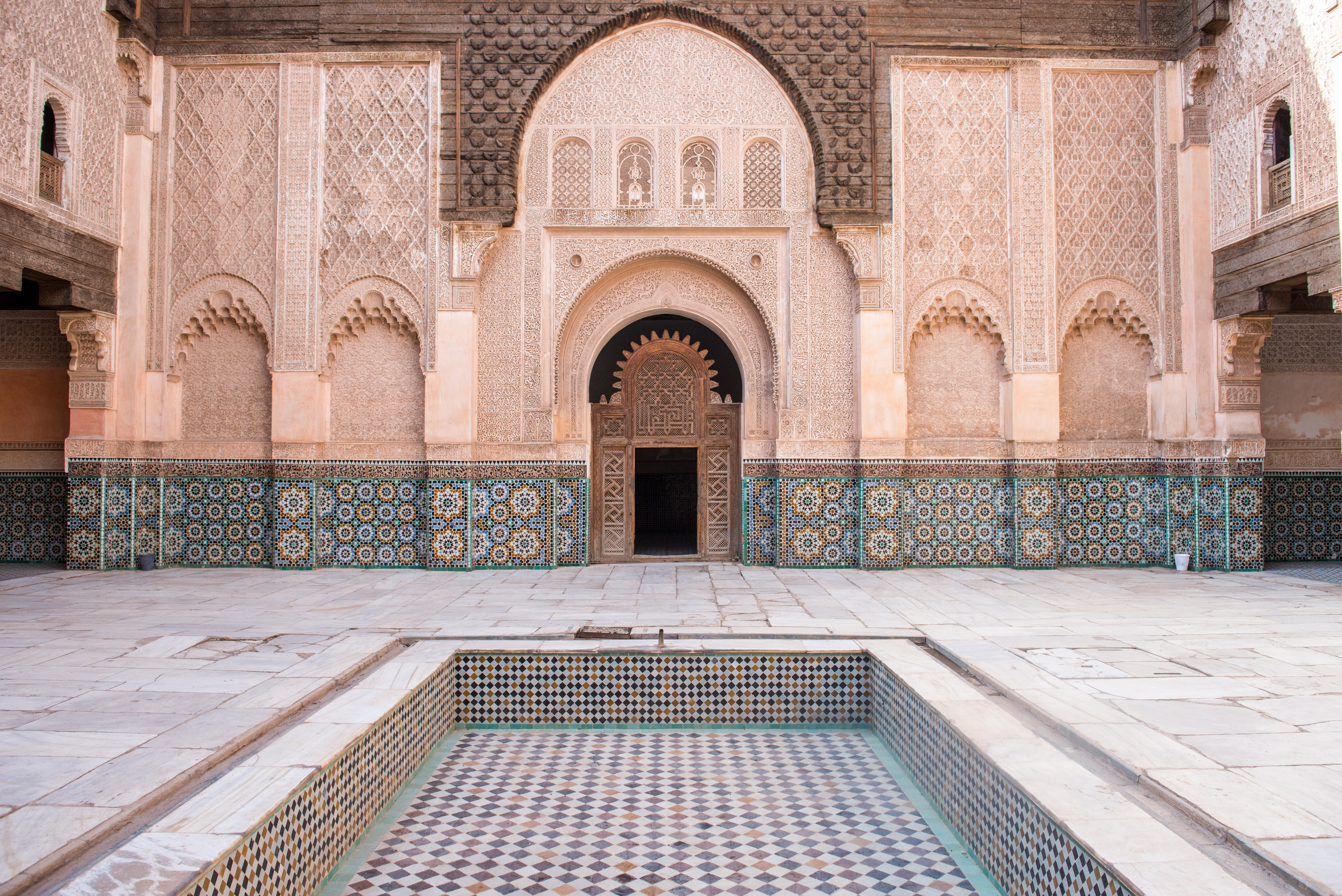
View of the main courtyard and its central water basin

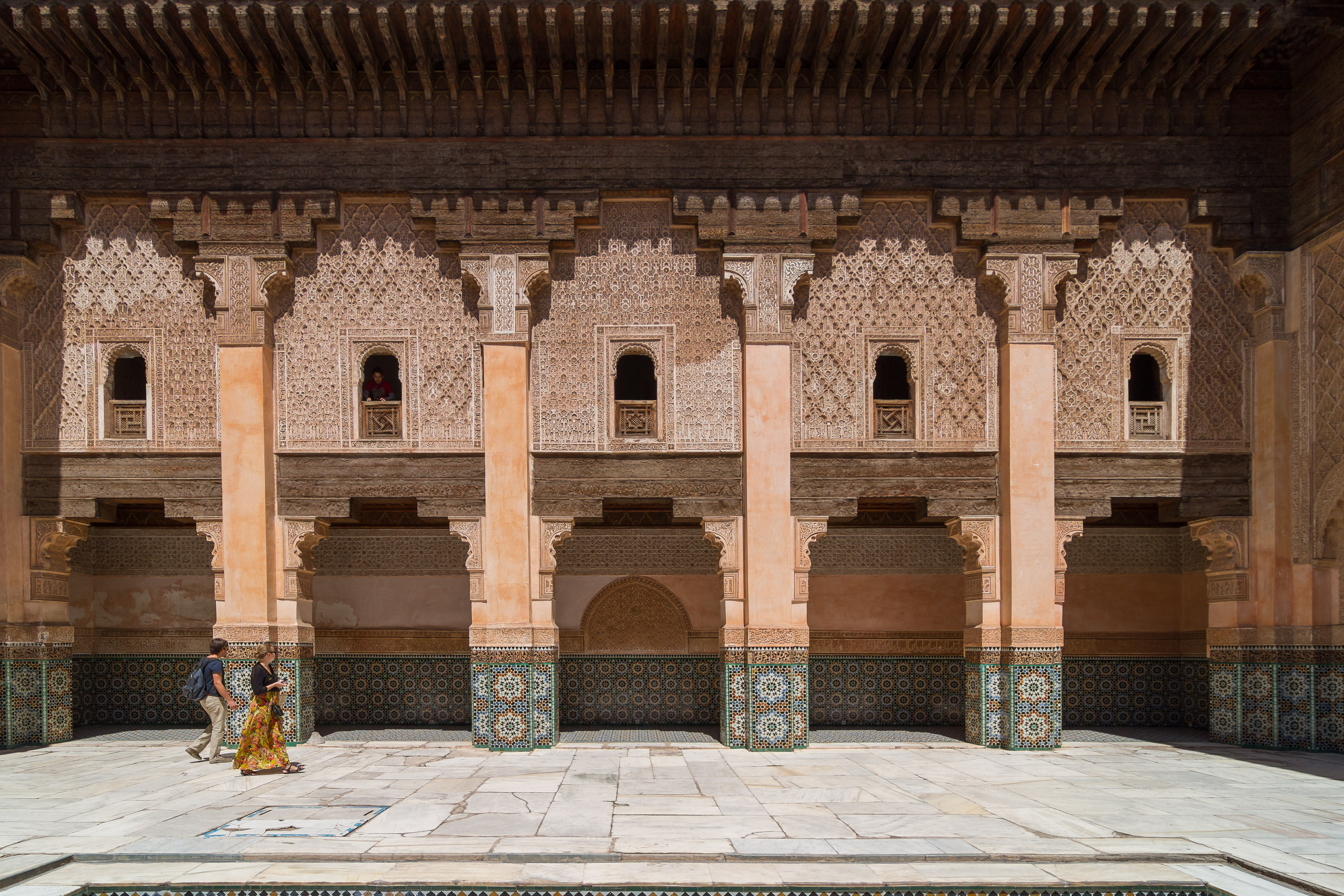
One of the galleries along the side of the courtyard; the upper floor windows belong to the dormitory rooms

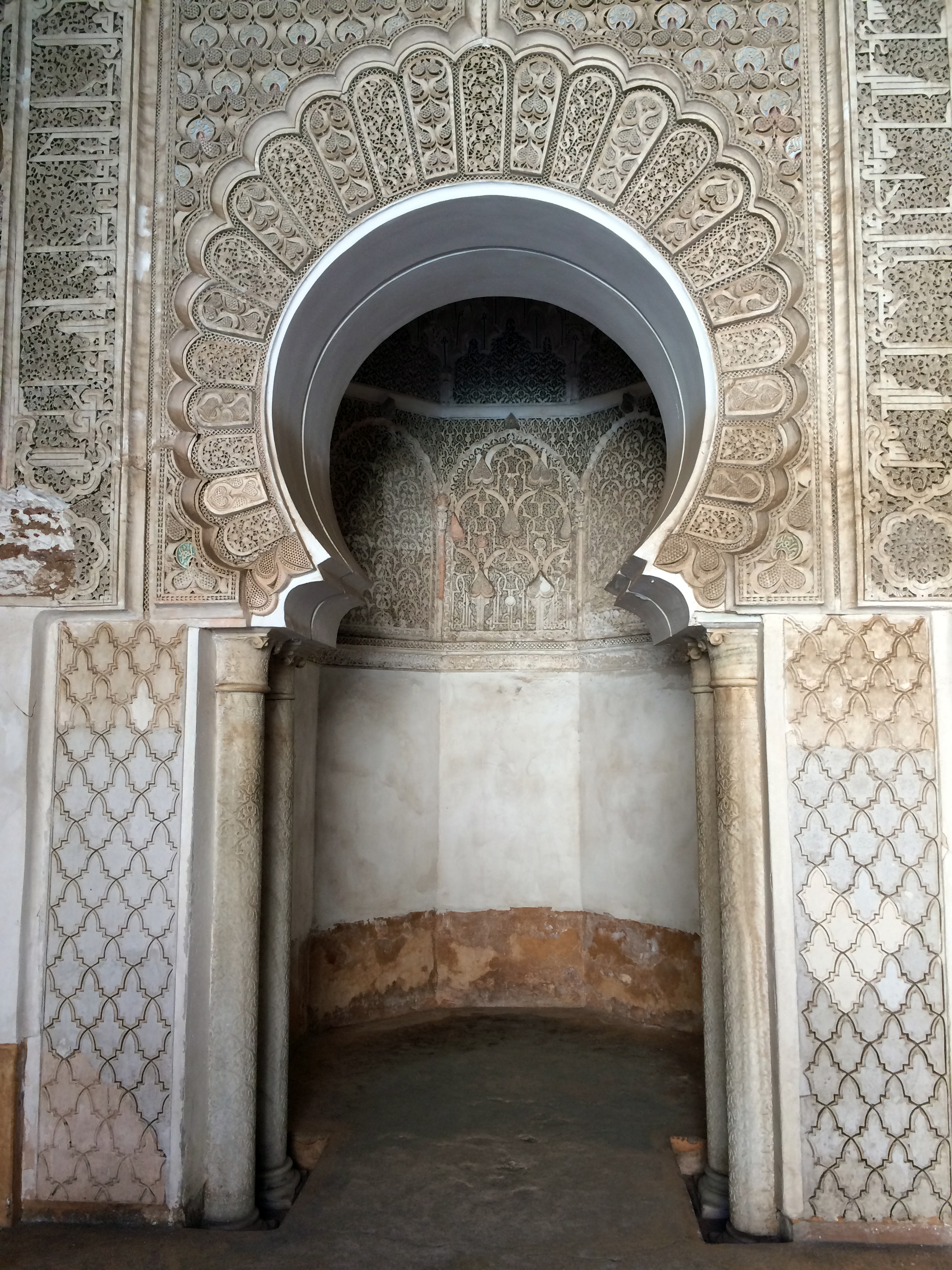
Mihrab of the prayer hall with carved stucco decoration, including darj wa ktaf motifs and an Arabic inscription in kufic script

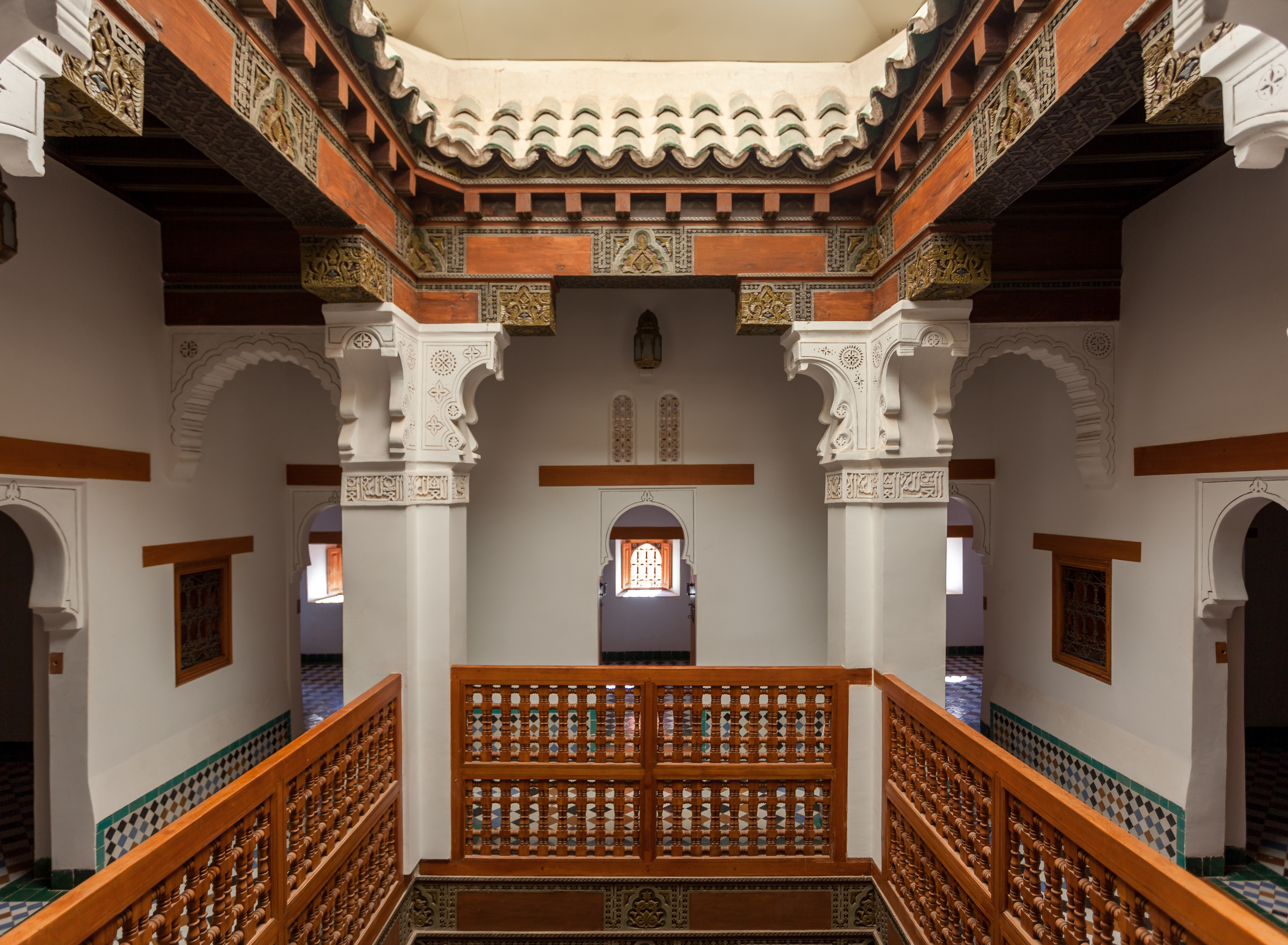
One of the small courtyards serving the student dormitories

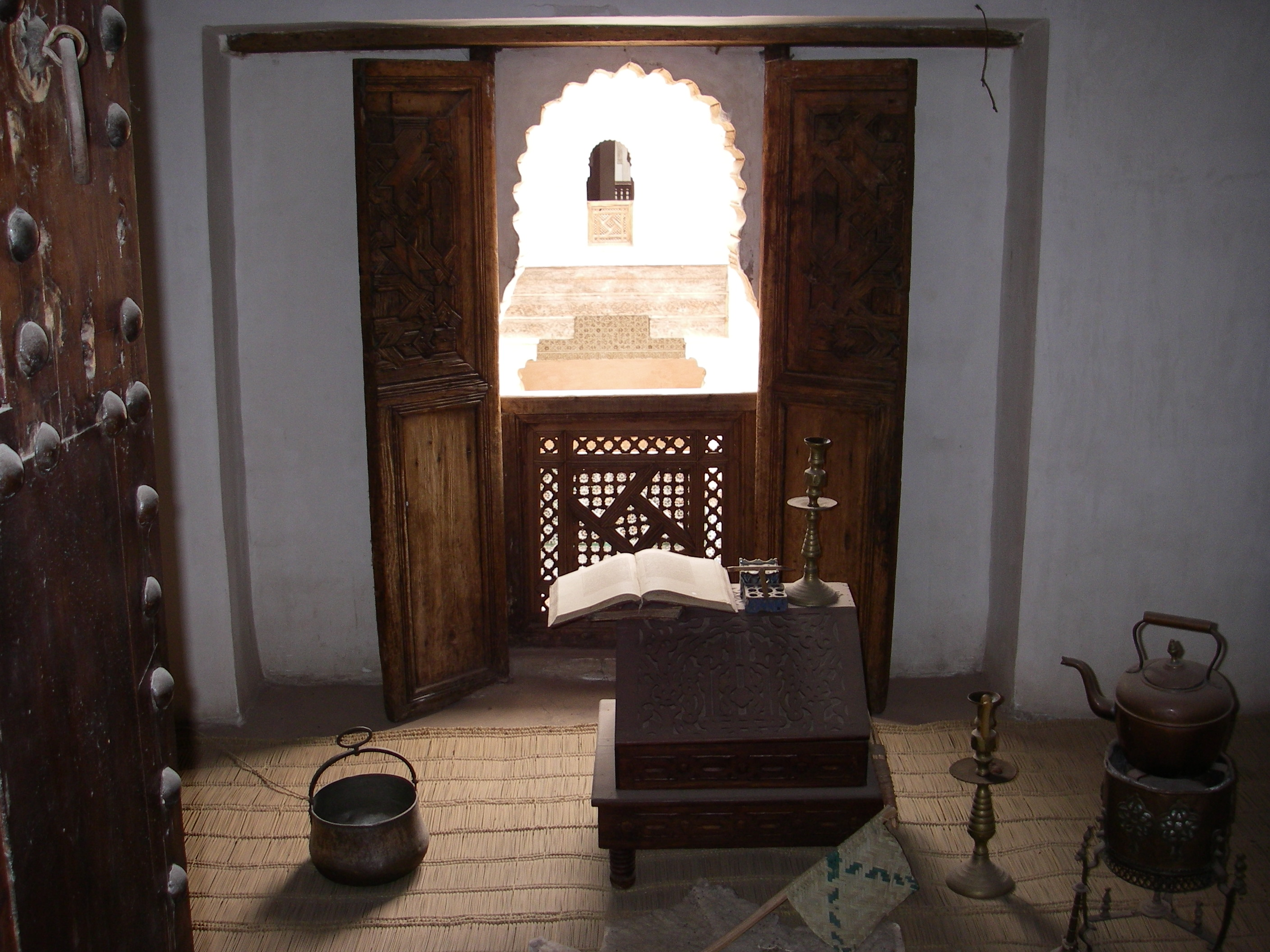
One of the upstairs student rooms

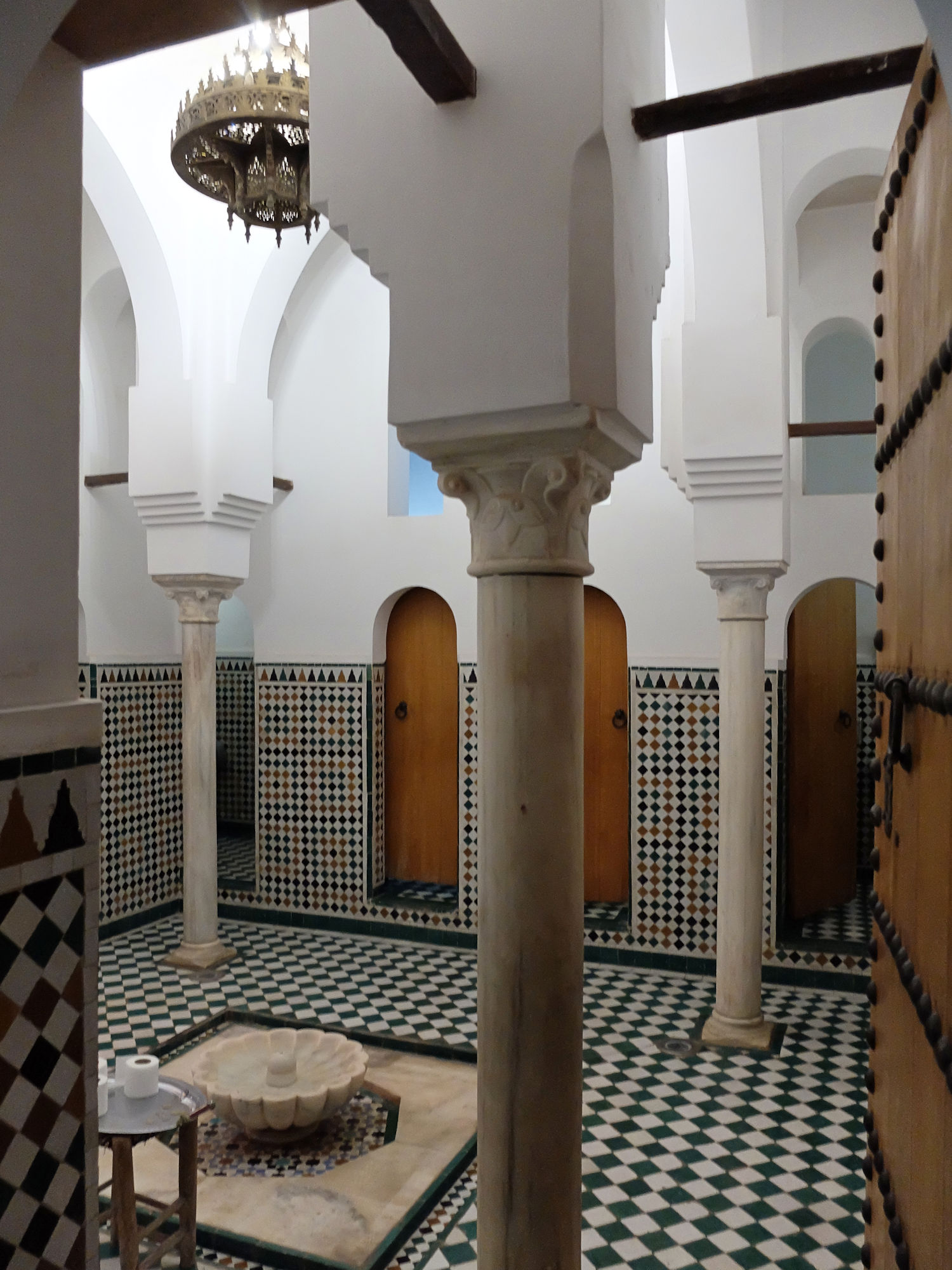
The ablutions chamber of the madrasa

=== Ornamentation ===
The ornamentation of the Ben Youssef Madrasa derives closely from that of earlier Moroccan and Andalusi architecture, which makes use of pools, gardens, fountains, and surfaces covered in zellij (mosaic tilework) and intricately carved stucco and wood. In particular, the decorative arrangement follows the architectural traditions established in earlier Marinid madrasas: zellij tiling is used along lower walls, calligraphic friezes are generally present at eye-level, and the middle and upper areas of the walls are covered in stucco decoration before transitioning into wooden elements, including ornately carved eaves. The arches of the ground-floor galleries in the courtyard also have stucco consoles supporting carved wooden lintels that bridge the distances between each pier. The main central courtyard of the madrasa communicates a strong visual experience for visitors and students via these embellishing elements and their symmetrical arrangement. This courtyard is entered from the vestibule via a wooden screen (mashrabiyya) under a monumental archway which is itself decorated with carved stucco. Although the student cells that surround the courtyard have little to no interior decorative elements, the small secondary courtyards that grant access to them do bear some stucco and wooden decoration. The motifs carved into wood and stucco include traditional elements such as arabesques, sebka (or dark wa ktaf), calligraphic inscriptions, and muqarnas, as well as more distinctly Saadian-era motifs such as pine cones.

The street entrance of the madrasa is overlooked by an elaborate muqarnas (stalactite or honeycomb-like sculpting) vault in front of the doorway, while another muqarnas cupola is found in the ablutions chamber. The doors of the madrasa are plated with bronze forming an interlacing geometric pattern and enhanced with shallow carved arabesque motifs. The cedar wood lintel above the doors is carved with an Arabic inscription on an arabesque background. The inscription names and praises Sultan Abdallah as the builder of the madrasa. Numerous other inscriptions are also found throughout the building on various surfaces, often consisting of Qur'anic verses. The large Kufic inscription around the arch of the mihrab, for example, includes the basmala and the tasliyya followed by verse 36 and the beginning of verse 37 from the Surah an-Nur.

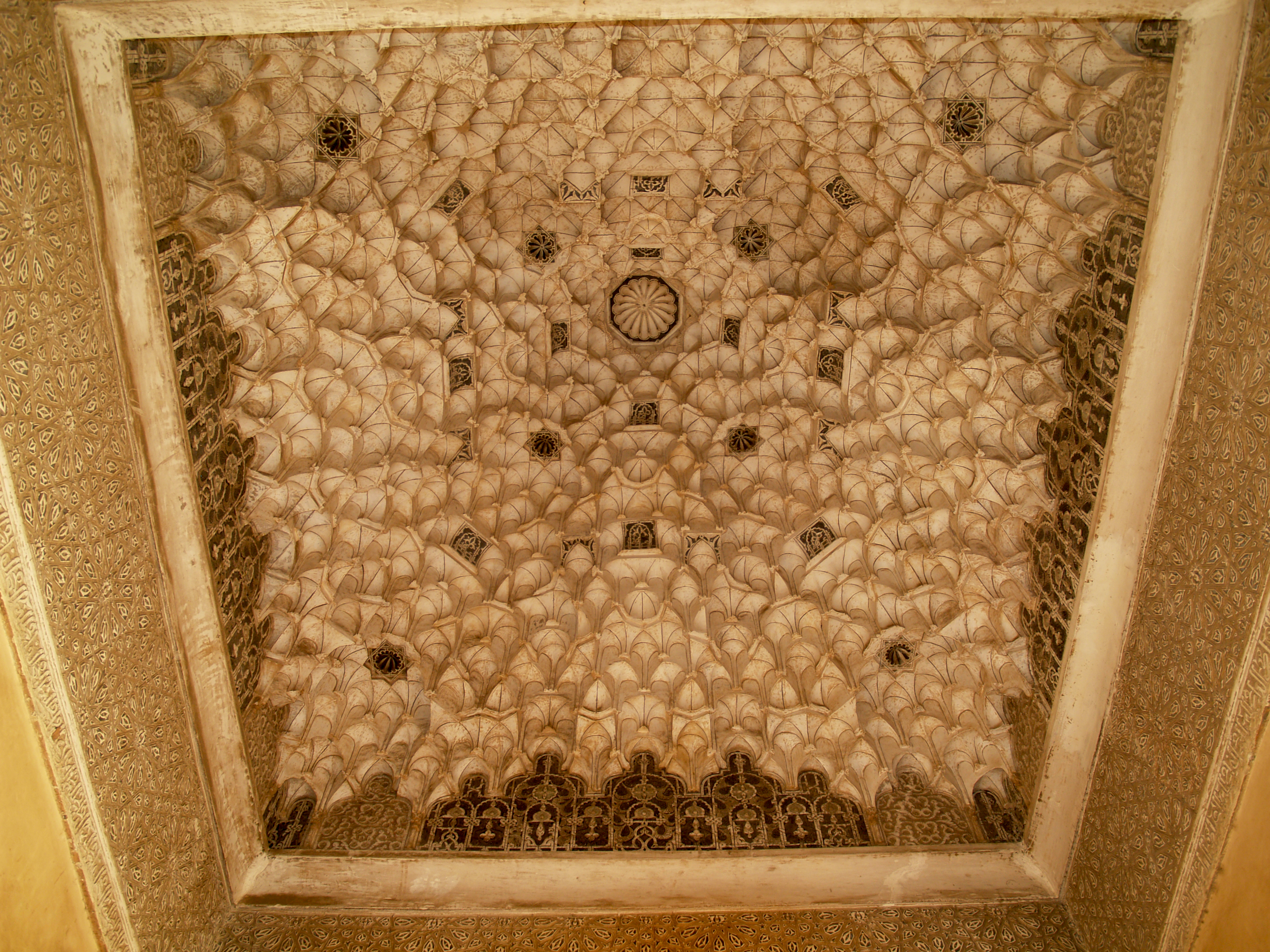
The muqarnas cupola in front of the madrasa's street entrance

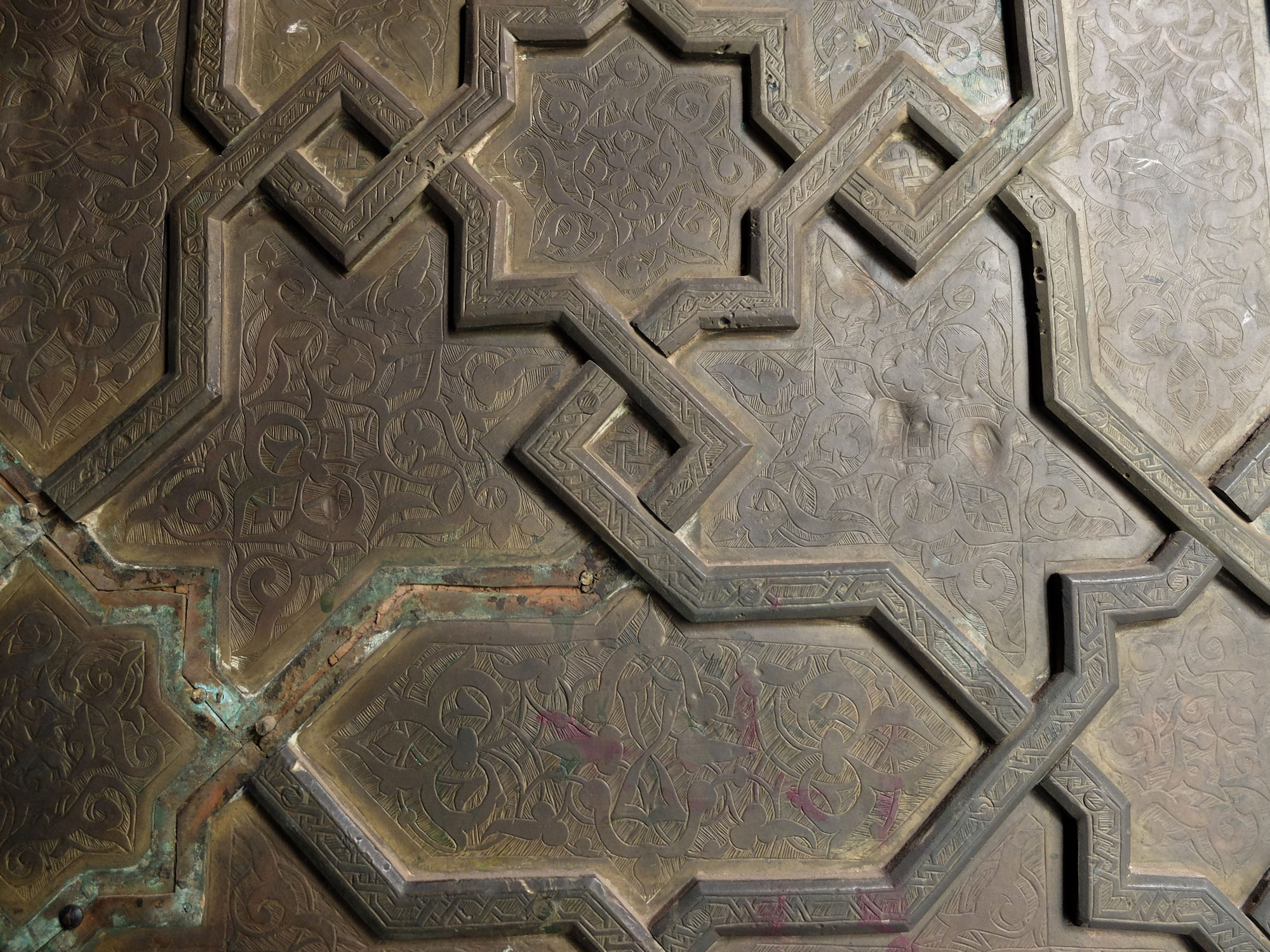
Detail of the bronze plating on the doors of the madrasa's entrance

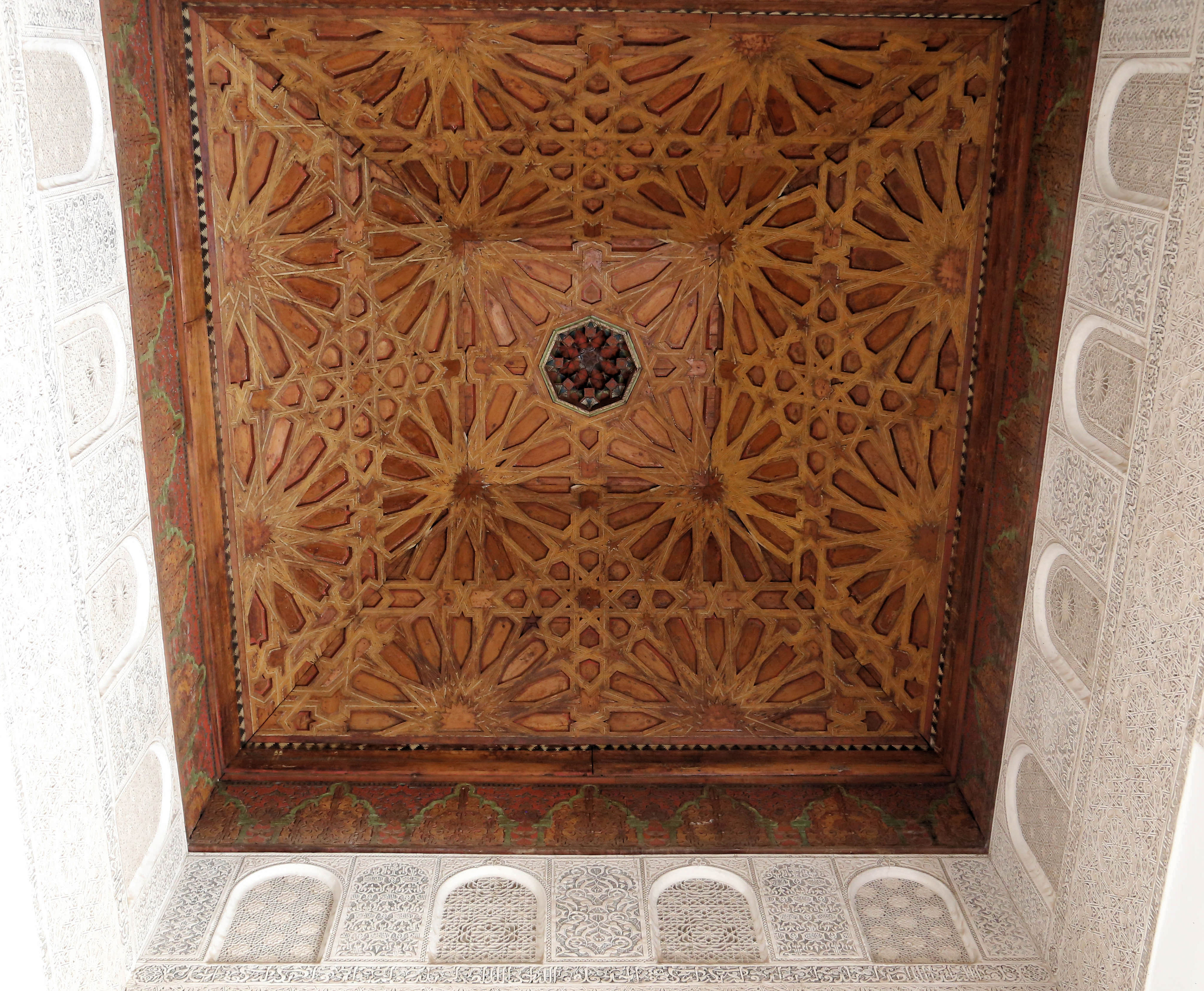
Example of carved cedar wood ceiling with geometric star patterns (over the madrasa's vestibule)

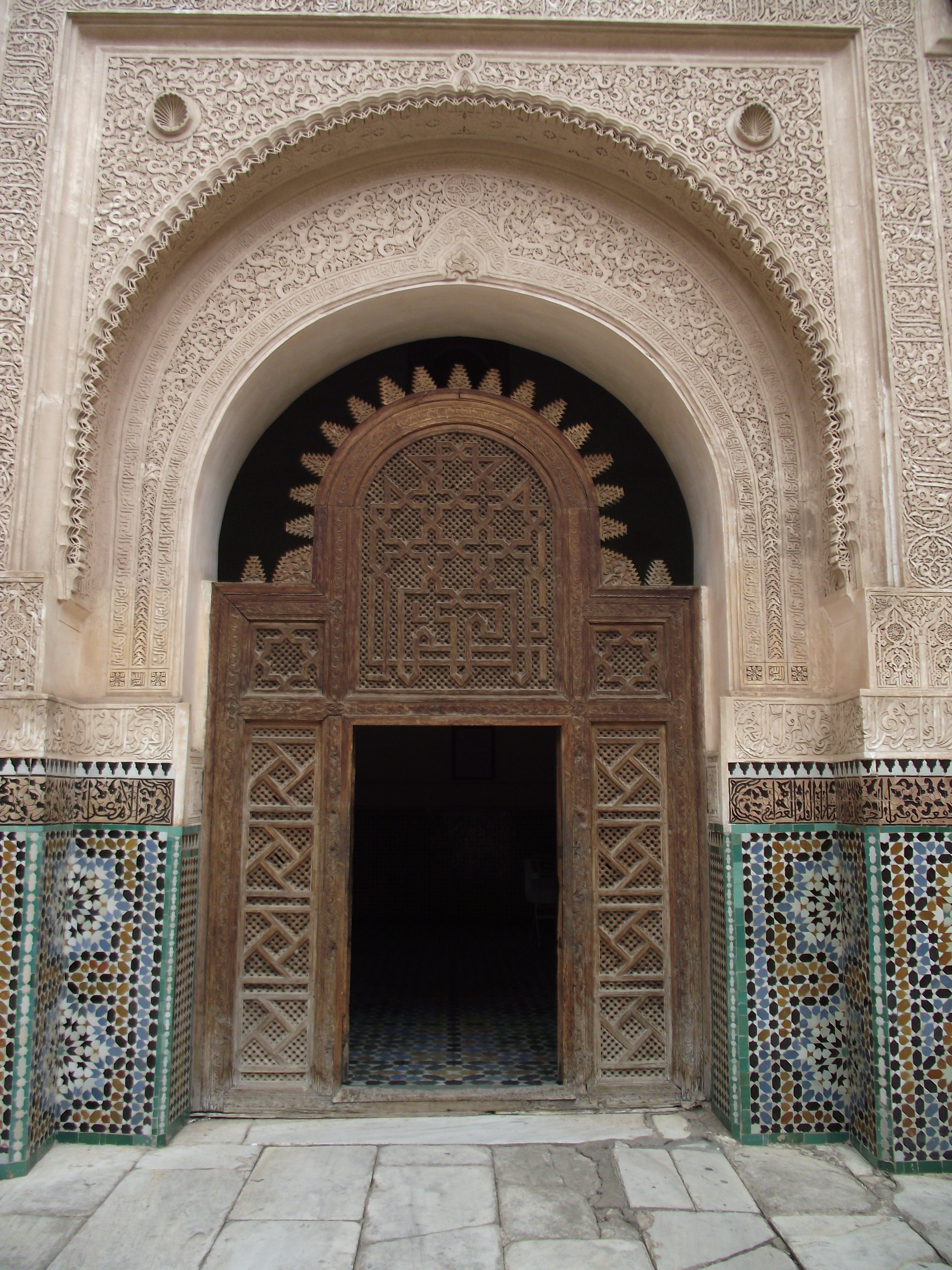
Entrance to the central courtyard adorned with cedar wood screen (mashrabiya) and carved stucco around the archway

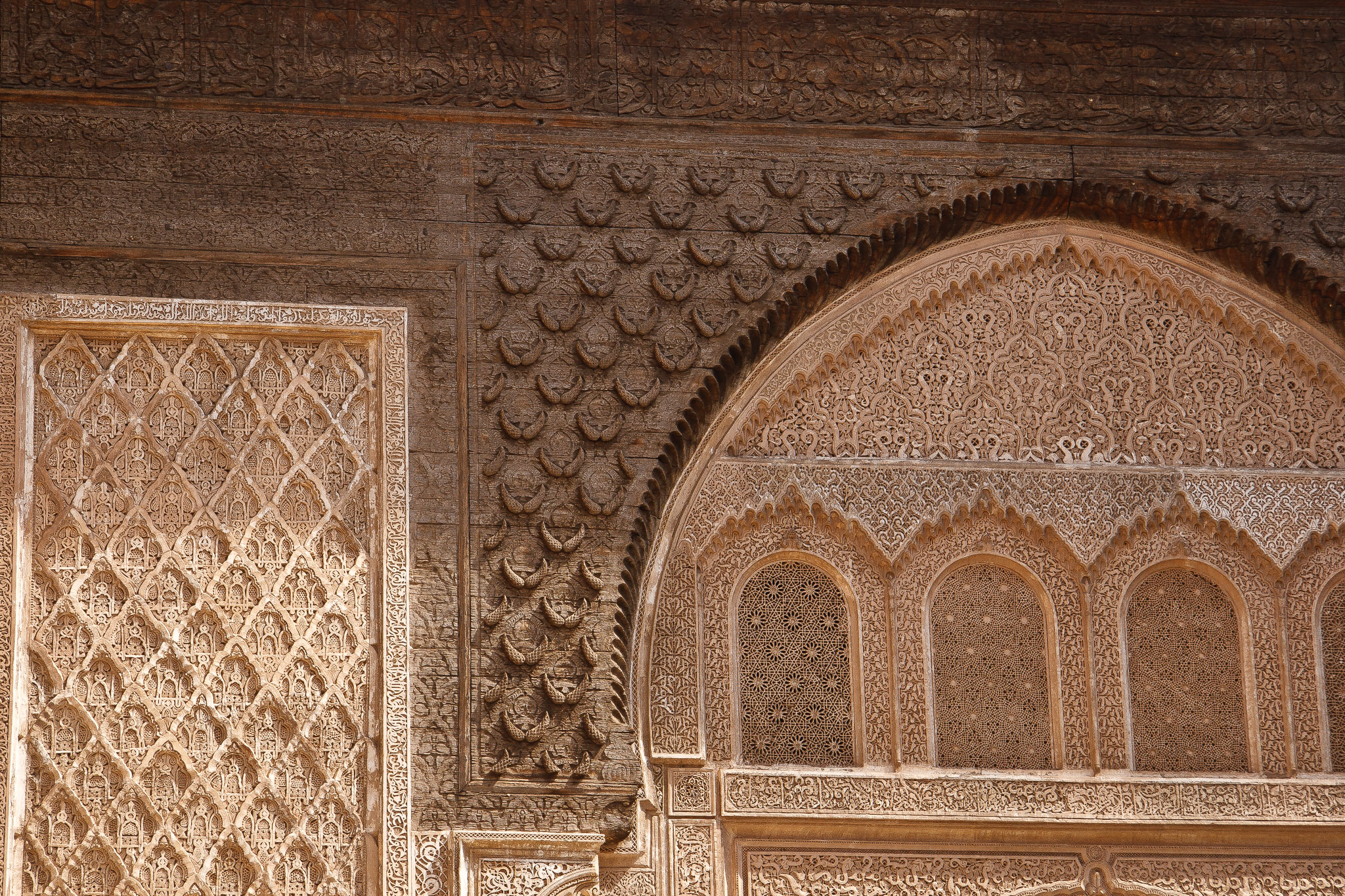
Carved stucco and wood decoration of the courtyard, with a variety of motifs including arabesques, calligraphy, pine cones, and darj w ktaf

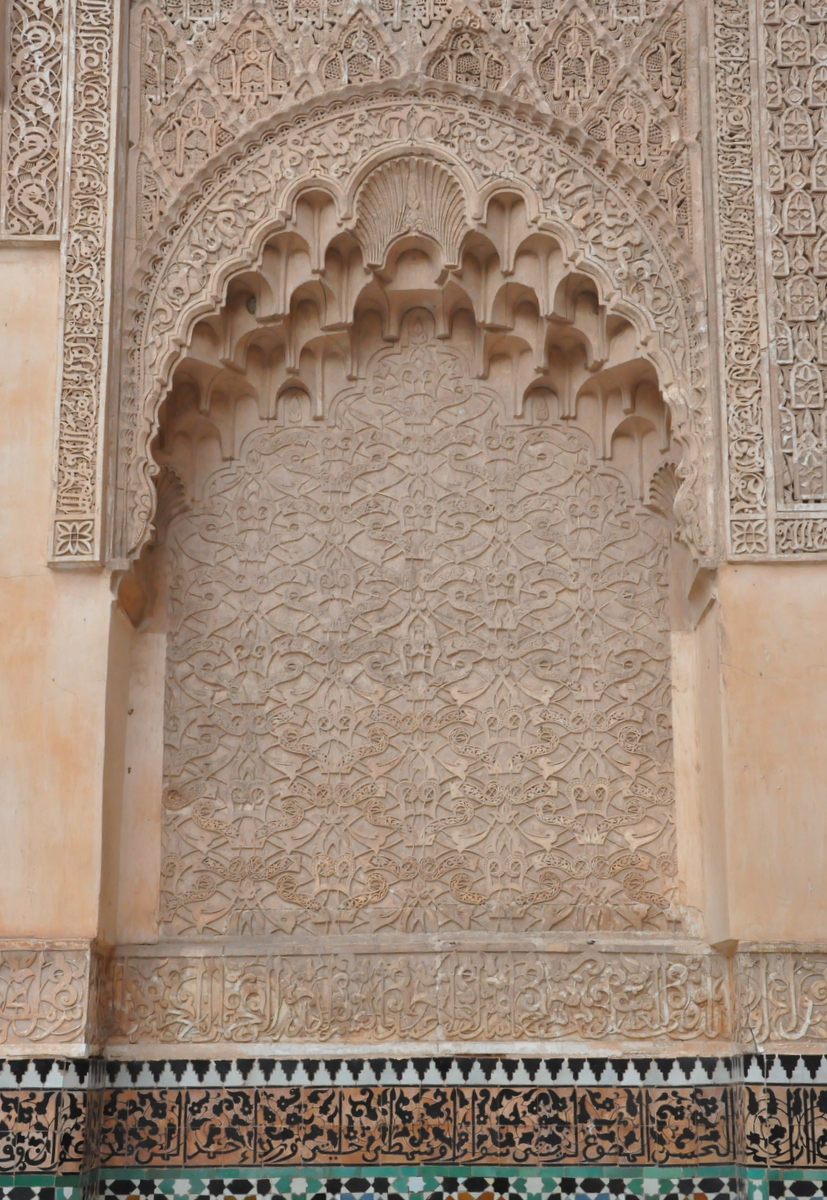
One of the niches on the walls of the courtyard with stucco carved into muqarnas

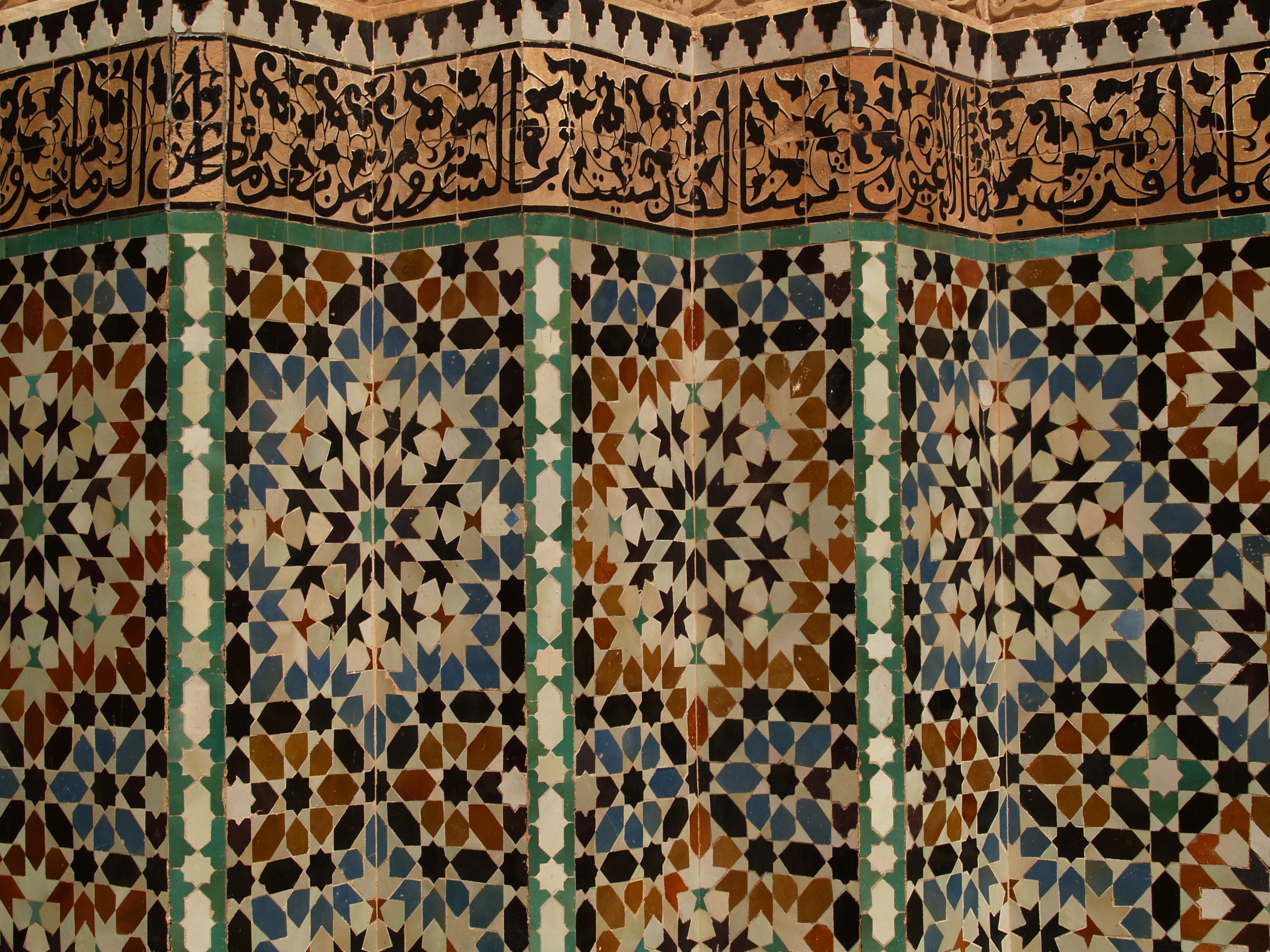
Zellij mosaic tilework in the madrasa

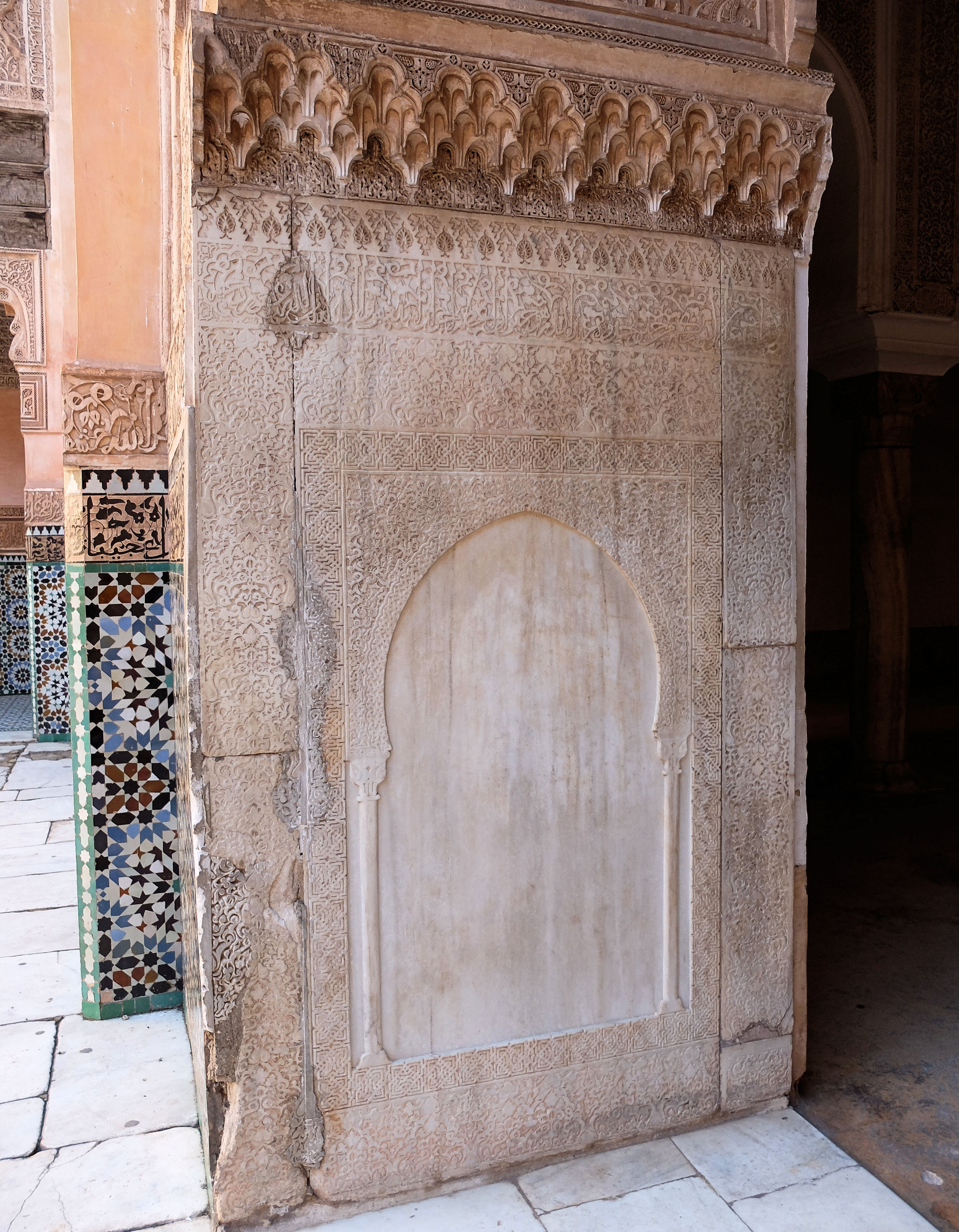
One of the Saadian-era carved marble panels at the entrance to the prayer hall

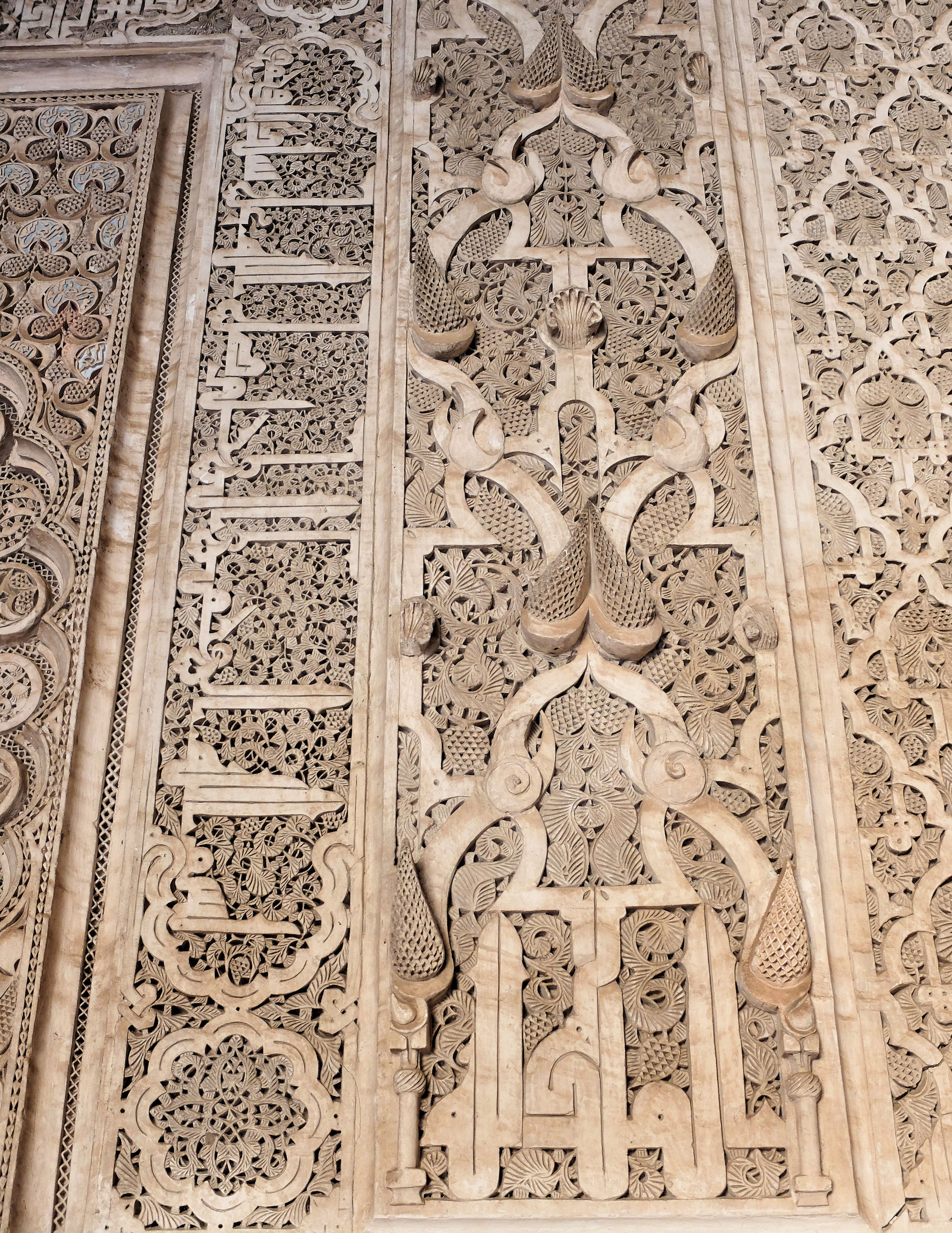
Arabesque and pine cone motifs along with Kufic inscriptions around the mihrab

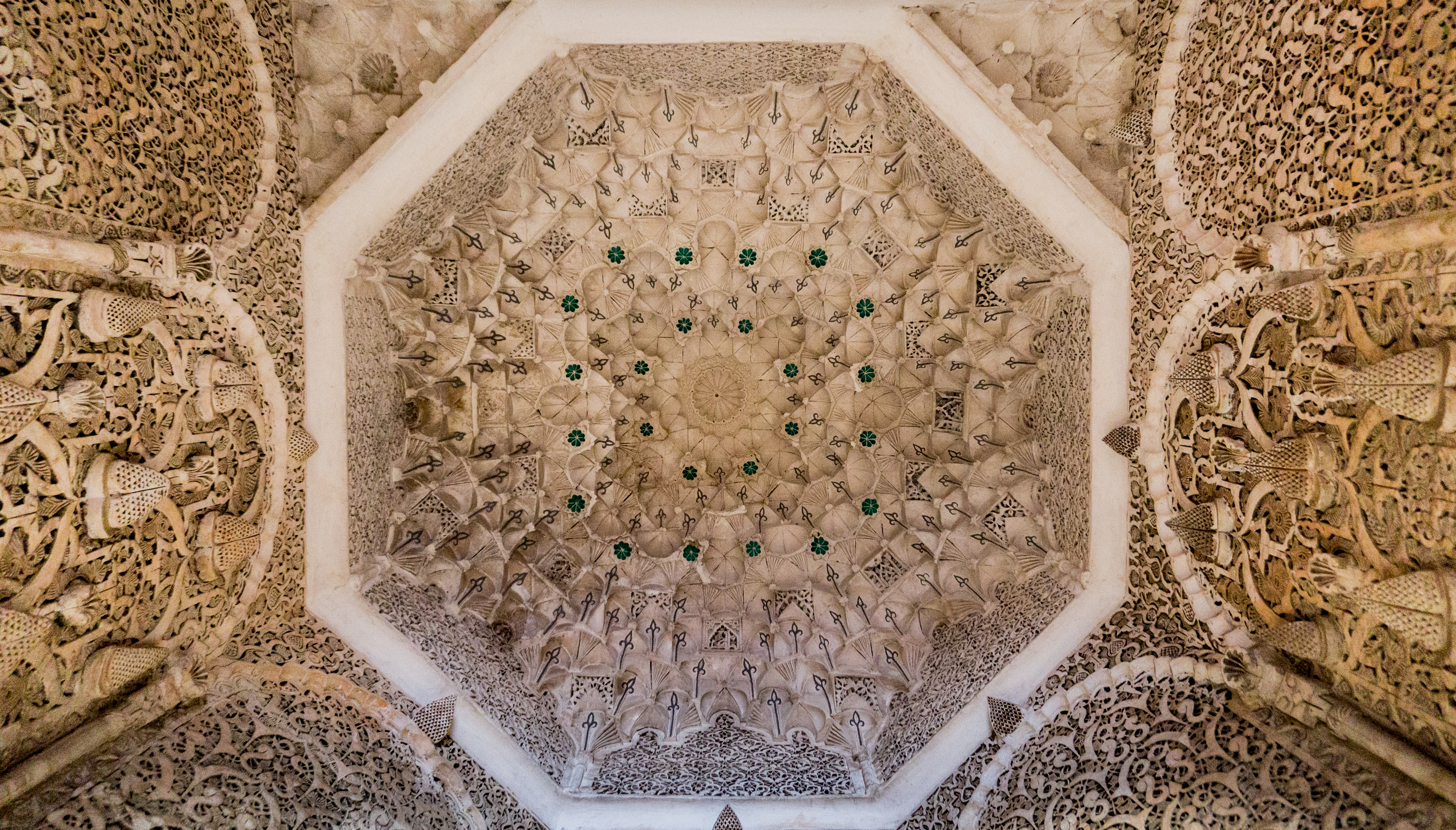
The muqarnas dome inside the mihrab; the sides are also covered in carved stucco with arabesque and pine cone motifs

== Andalusi marble basin ==
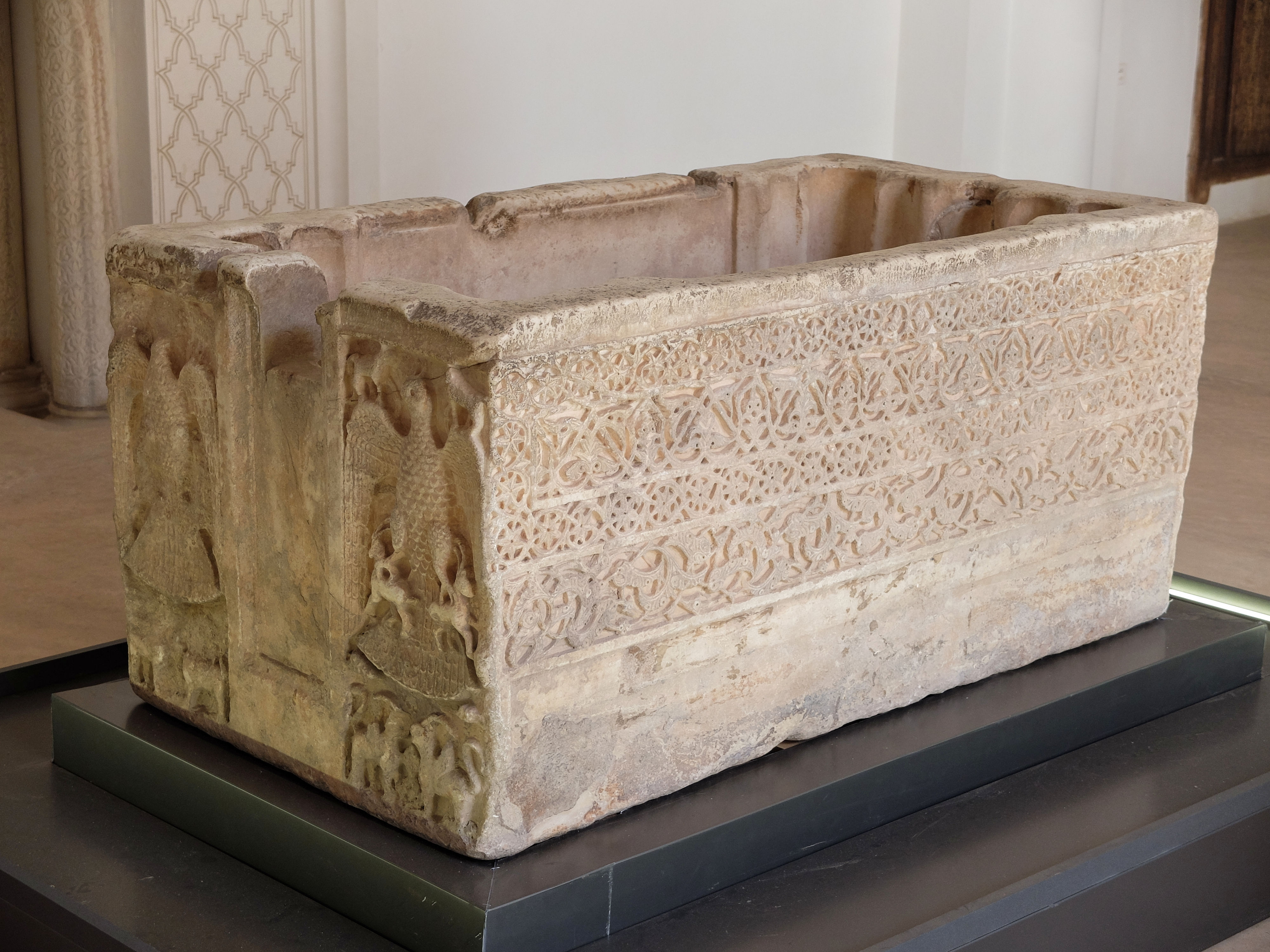
Carved marble basin crafted in Cordoba between 1002 and 1007 in the late caliphal period, on display in the madrasa's prayer hall

On display in the madrasa today is an elaborately carved marble basin from the Caliphate era of Cordoba (in present-day Spain). It was crafted at Madinat al-Zahra between 1002 and 1007 to serve as an ablutions basin and was dedicated to 'Abd al-Malik, the son of al-Mansur, and was one of a series. It was previously kept at the Ben Youssef Madrasa for centuries and was first noted by experts in 1923. Scholar Mariam Rosser-Owen has suggested that the basin was originally imported to Marrakesh by Ali Ibn Yusuf, who incorporated a number of marble spolia from the ruined palaces of Cordoba in the Ben Youssef Mosque that he built in the 12th century. The basin would have then been re-used again for the Ben Youssef Madrasa, which was built in the same area much later, after the mosque had fallen into neglect. In the 20th century, the basin was removed for study and was housed until recently at the Dar Si Said Museum. After the recent restoration of the madrasa and the reorganization of the Dar Si Said Museum, the basin has been moved again and is now on display in the prayer hall of the madrasa.

== See also ==
- Bou Inania Madrasa in Fes
- Bou Inania Madrasa (Meknes)
- Shrob ou shouf fountain
- El Badi Palace
- Saadian Tombs
