= Alcazaba of Málaga =

Palatial fortification in Málaga, Spain

- Alcazaba de Málaga
- Málaga, Spain
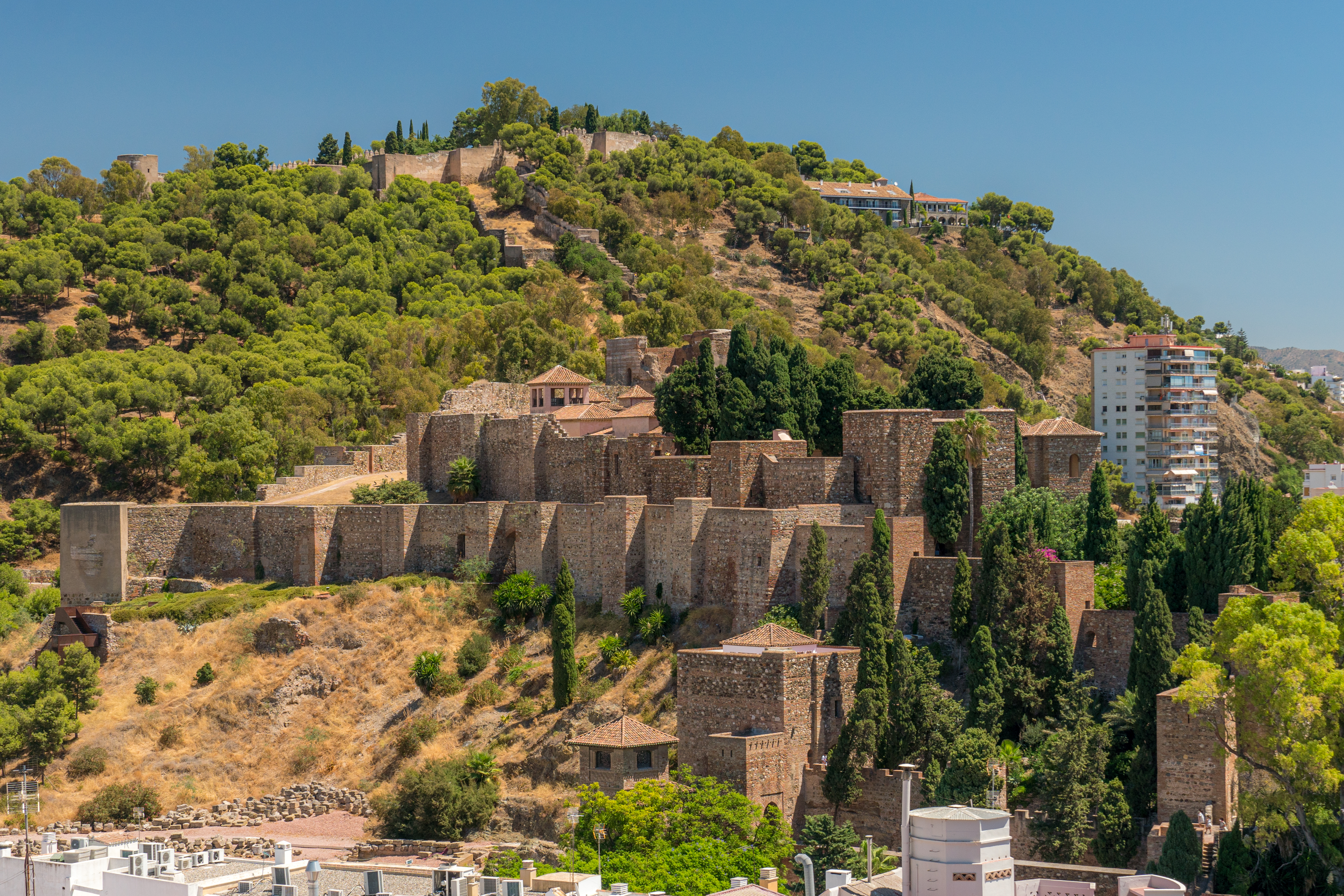
- The Alcazaba of Málaga from the Cathedral

Site information
- Type: Palatial fortress
- Open to the public: Yes
- Condition: Well-preserved (partly reconstructed)

Location
- Coordinates: 36°43′17″N 4°24′56″W

Site history
- Built: 10th century-15th century
- Built by: Hammudids, Nasrids

The Alcazaba (Spanish: [alkaˈθaβa, alkaˈsaβa]; from Arabic: القَصَبَة, romanized: al-qaṣabah, pronounced [alˈqasˤaba]; lit. 'citadel') is a palatial fortification in Málaga, Spain, built during the period of Muslim-ruled Al-Andalus. The current complex was begun in the 11th century and was modified or rebuilt multiple times up to the 14th century. It is one of the best-preserved alcazabas in Spain. The Alcazaba is also connected by a walled corridor to the higher Castle of Gibralfaro, and adjacent to the entrance of the Alcazaba are remnants of a Roman theatre dating to the 1st century AD.

== History ==
The Gibralfaro and the hill on which the Alcazaba is built was previously occupied by Phoenicians since around 600 BC, and remains of a Phoenician fortification wall have been uncovered there. During the Roman period of the city (after 205 BC), the area was occupied by a Roman villa and industrial facilities. A Roman theater, excavated and visible today, was built into the western slope of the hill in the 1st century AD. After the Muslim conquest of the Iberian Peninsula in the early 8th century, historical sources mention the existence of a fortress on the hill, constructed by Abd ar-Rahman I (r. 756–788) and including a mosque inside.

The current Alcazaba was begun by the Hammudid dynasty in the early 11th century, probably under the reign of Yahya I (r. 1021–1036), from which time some of the preserved palace architecture may date. Following the capture of Malaga by the Zirids of Granada in 1056, some additions were made during the reign of Badis (d. 1073), possibly the double-walled fortifications or a wider reconstruction. In the early 14th century, when Malaga was under the control of the Emirate of Granada, the Alcazaba was largely rebuilt by the Nasrid emir Muhammad II, including the fortifications and the palatial residences. The Castle of Gibralfaro, on a higher hill to the east, was built by the Nasrid emir Yusuf I (r. 1333–1354), also on the site of previous fortifications. Yusuf also built a walled corridor connecting the castle with the lower citadel, creating a nearly impregnable fortified complex.

In a crucial event near the end of the Reconquista, the Spanish monarchs Ferdinand and Isabella captured Málaga from the Muslims during the Siege of Málaga, which began on 6 May 1487 and ended with the surrender of the city on 18 August that same year. After their victory, the monarchs raised their standard at the Torre del Homenaje in the inner citadel.

Starting in the 18th century, the Alcazaba's military function ceased. It was occupied by civilian residents and became a marginal neighbourhood of the city. Starting in 1933, under the direction of Leopoldo Torres Balbás, the residents were evacuated and restorations of the Alcazaba began, along with archaeological investigations.

== Layout and architecture ==
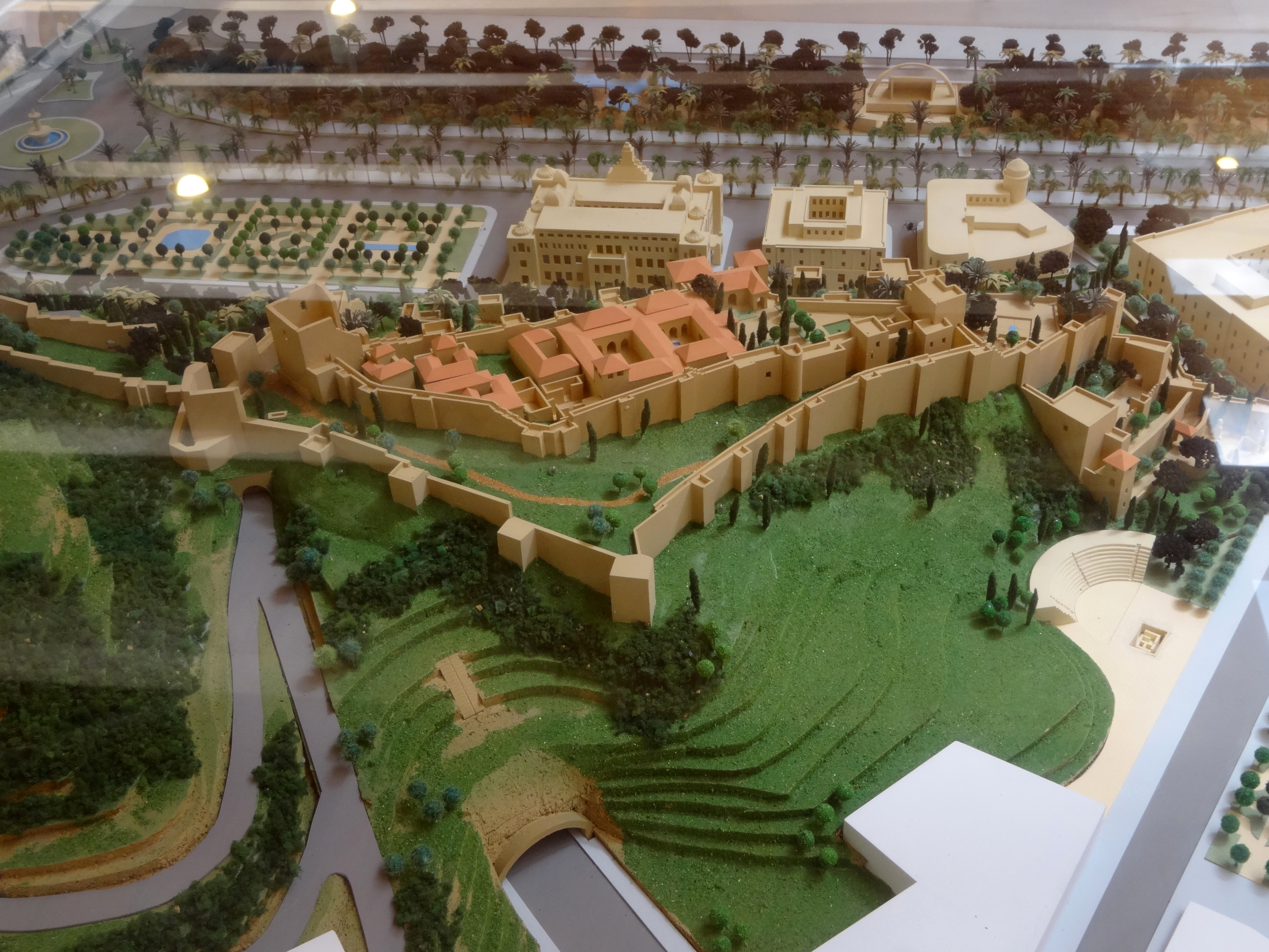
Model of the Alcazaba (displayed on site)

The Alcazaba of Málaga is built on a hill in the centre of the city, overlooking the port, and comprises two walled enclosures, one contained within the other. Each enclosure is defended by a wall fortified with towers. The inner enclosure occupies the summit of the hill and contains the palaces. Along with the double-layered fortifications, a total of five gates had to be crossed in order to reach the palace areas. This design contrasts with the earlier sprawling palace complexes that were built during the Umayyad Emirate and Caliphate periods of Al-Andalus (such as Madinat al-Zahra), and demonstrates the importance of military impregnability for the rulers of this period. The fortress was formerly connected to the city ramparts which formed a third defensive wall. According to architect restorer, Leopoldo Torres Balbás, the Alcazaba of Málaga is the prototype of military architecture in the Taifa period of Al-Andalus, with its double walls and massive entry fortifications.

=== Outer (lower) citadel ===
The outer entrance to the citadel is via a climbing passage that passes through multiple gates and doubles back on itself twice (known as a "bent entrance"), a design intended to make progress difficult for attacking forces. Part-way up, the passage goes through the Puerta de la Bóveda ('Gate of the Vault'), which forms one of the bends, and then through the Puerta de las Columnas ('Gate of the Columns'), which is a simpler straight passage. The name of the latter gate comes from the two Roman-era columns and capitals, reused from the nearby Roman theatre, that are integrated into the gate's façade. In the 18th century, the mayor or governor of the Alcazaba built his residence on top of this gate. Over time houses and residences were built along much of the entrance passage and covered it, so that by the 19th century it was known as the "Alcazaba Tunnel" (Túnel de la Alcazaba).

After the Puerta de las Columnas, another narrow space enclosed by walls continues upward towards the Arco del Cristo ('Arch of the Christ', also called the Torre del Cristo, 'Tower of the Christ'), another bent-entrance gate that finally leads into the outer citadel enclosure. The gate and its tower are so-named because one of the chambers in the tower was used as a chapel during the 19th century and housed an altarpiece depicting Christ. Beyond the gate, a short distance to the west and inside the outer citadel enclosure, is an open space now known as the Plaza de las Armas ('Place/Square of Arms'), now occupied by gardens. No original remains are extant in this area, but archeological work uncovered remains of a former parish church, probably from the time of Ferdinand and Isabella (right after the city was captured), which was built on top of a former mosque. Some parts of the outer enclosure are closed to the public today, including a large well, known as the Pozo Airón, which cuts into the bedrock to a depth of 30 meters, where a natural water source was used to supply the inhabitants of the citadel.

Gates of the Alcazaba

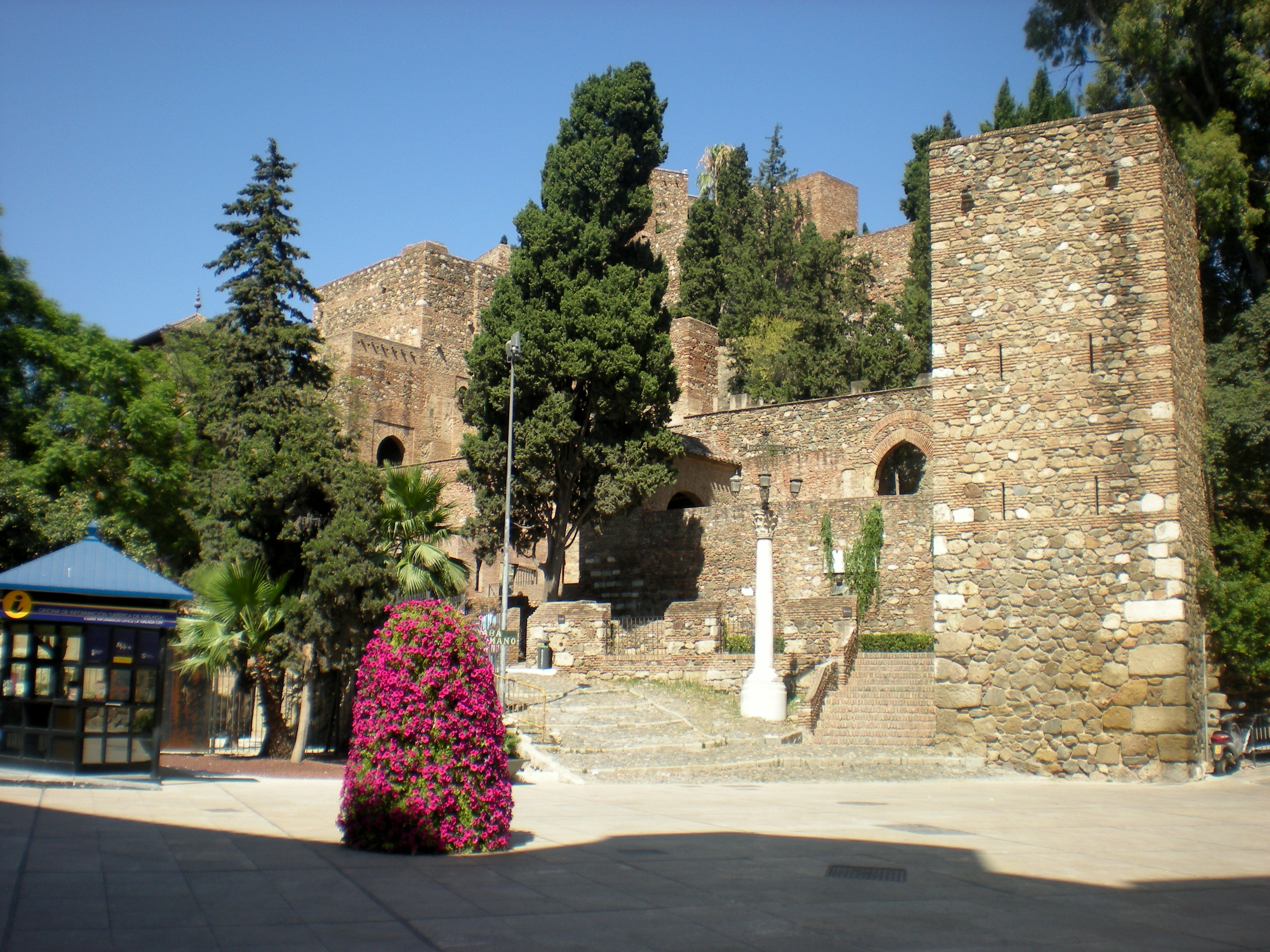
External view towards the entrance fortifications of the Alcazaba

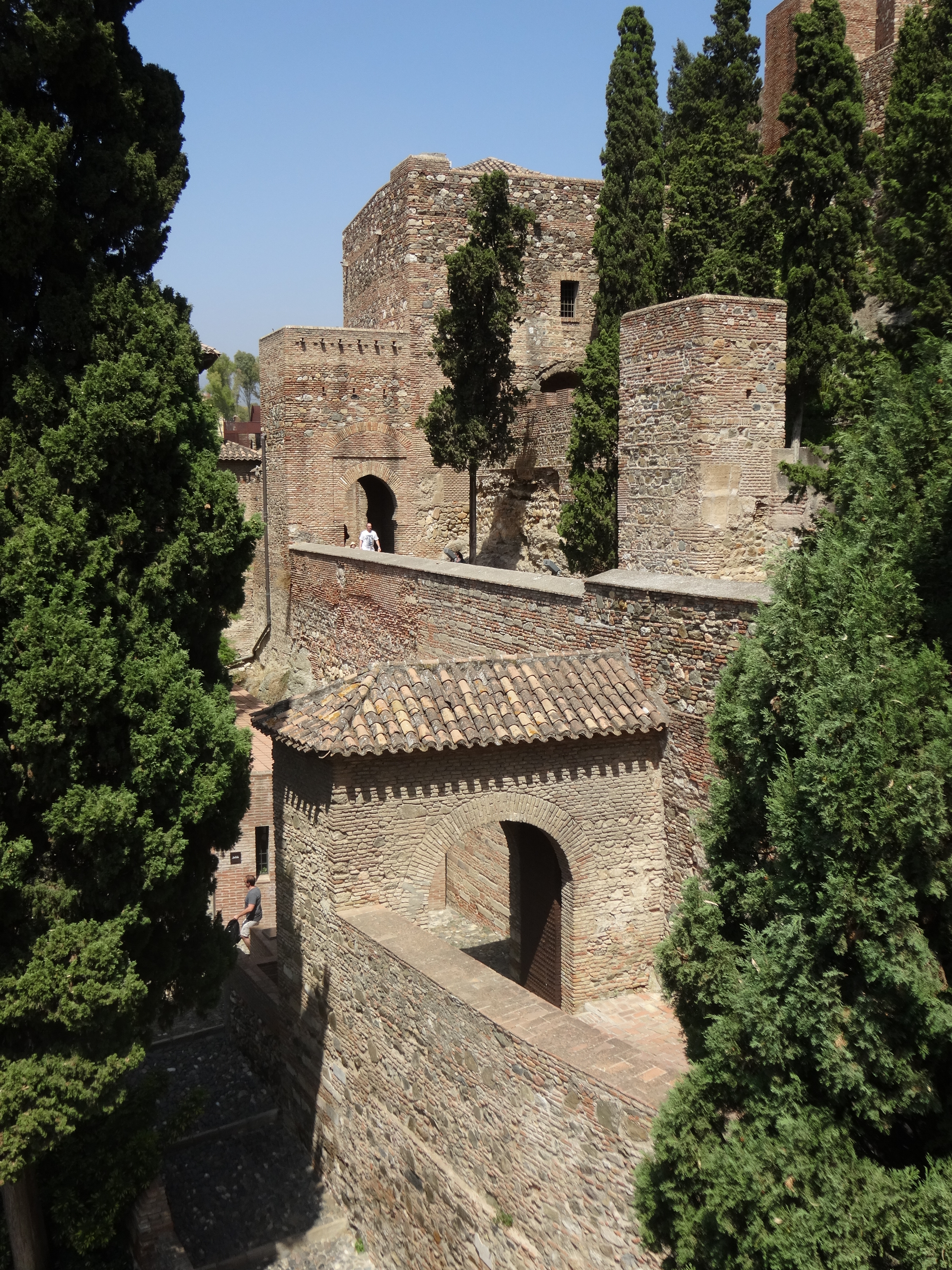
View of the entrance passage and outer gates of the Alcazaba

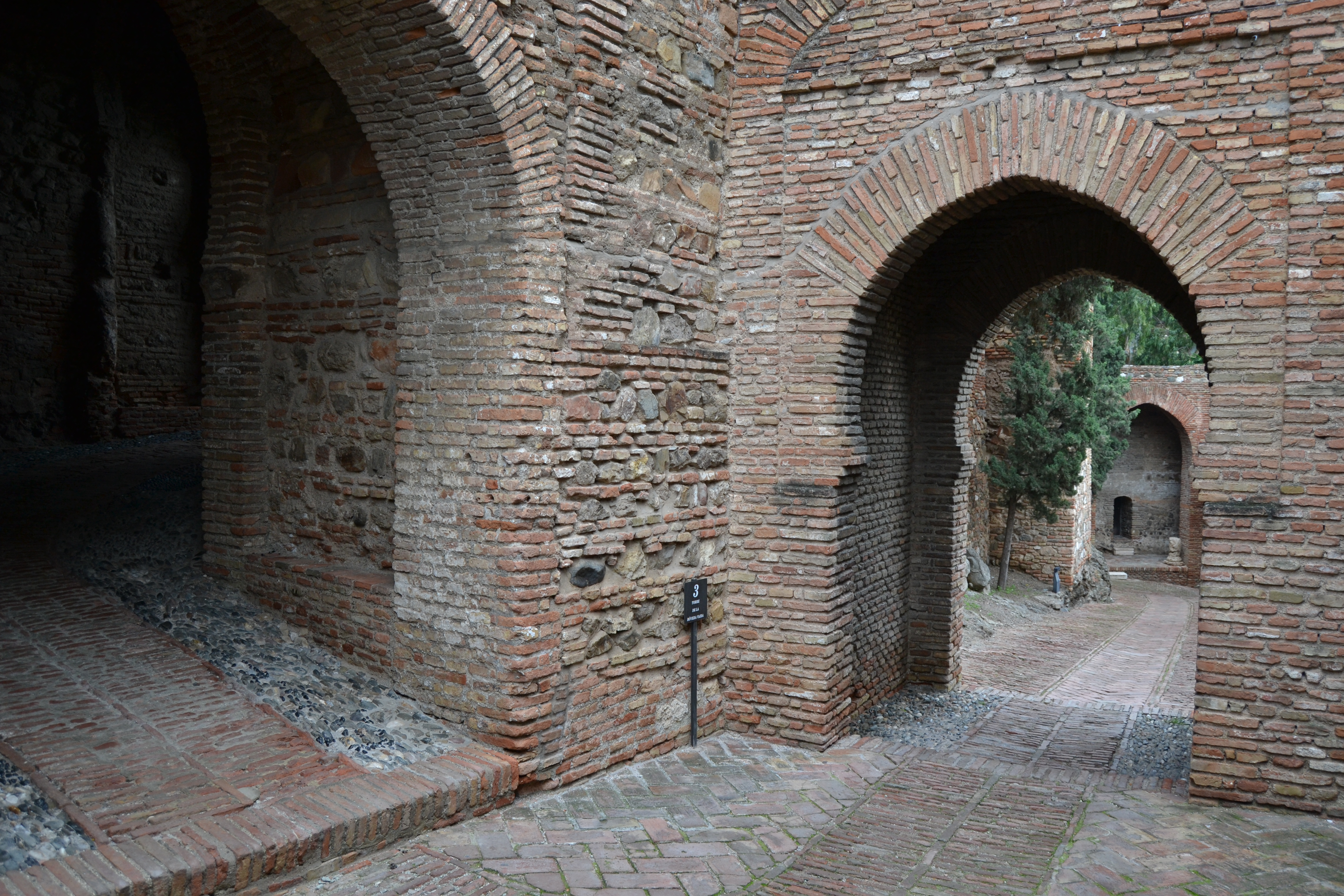
The bending passage of the Puerta de la Bóveda

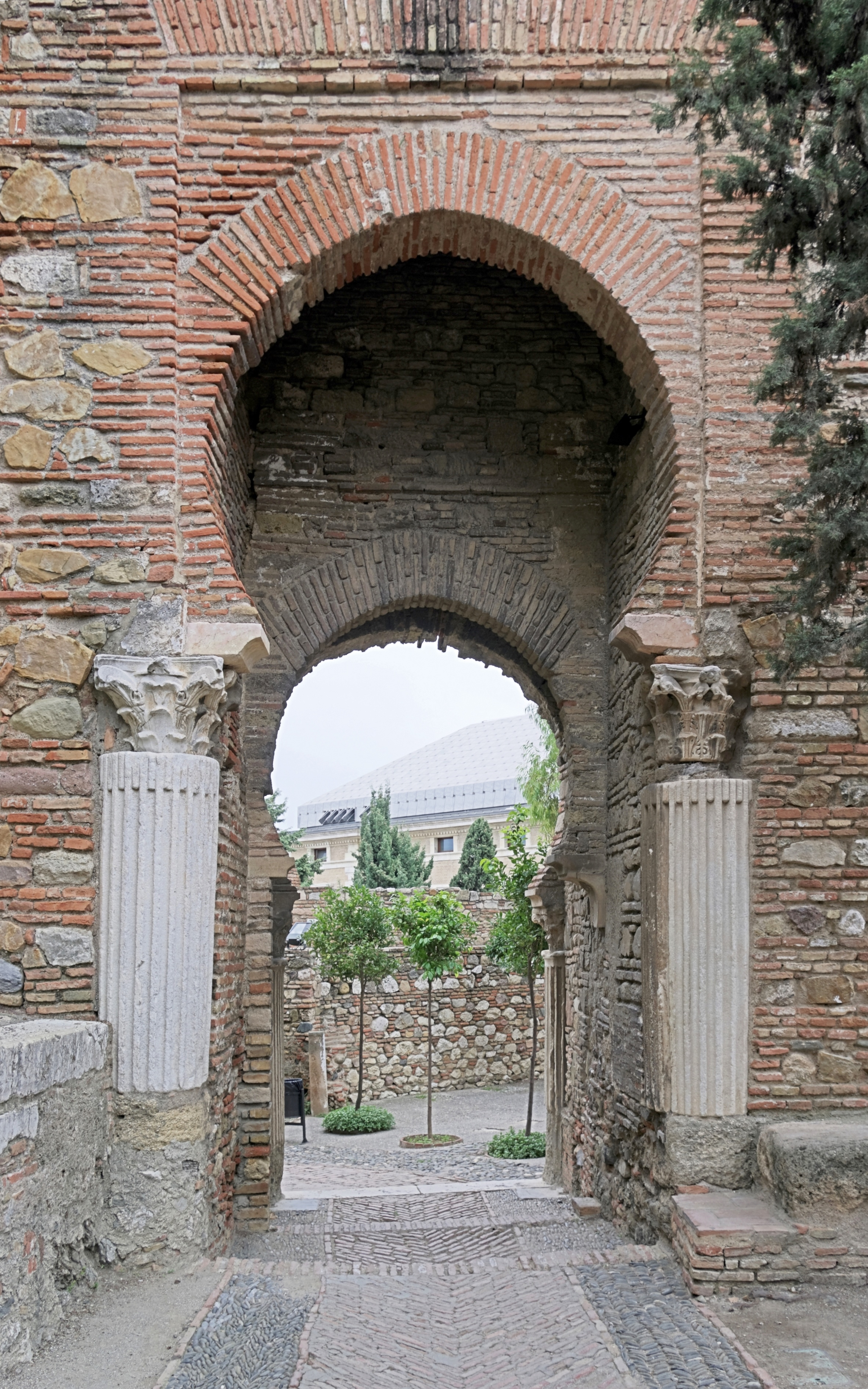
Puerta de las Columnas

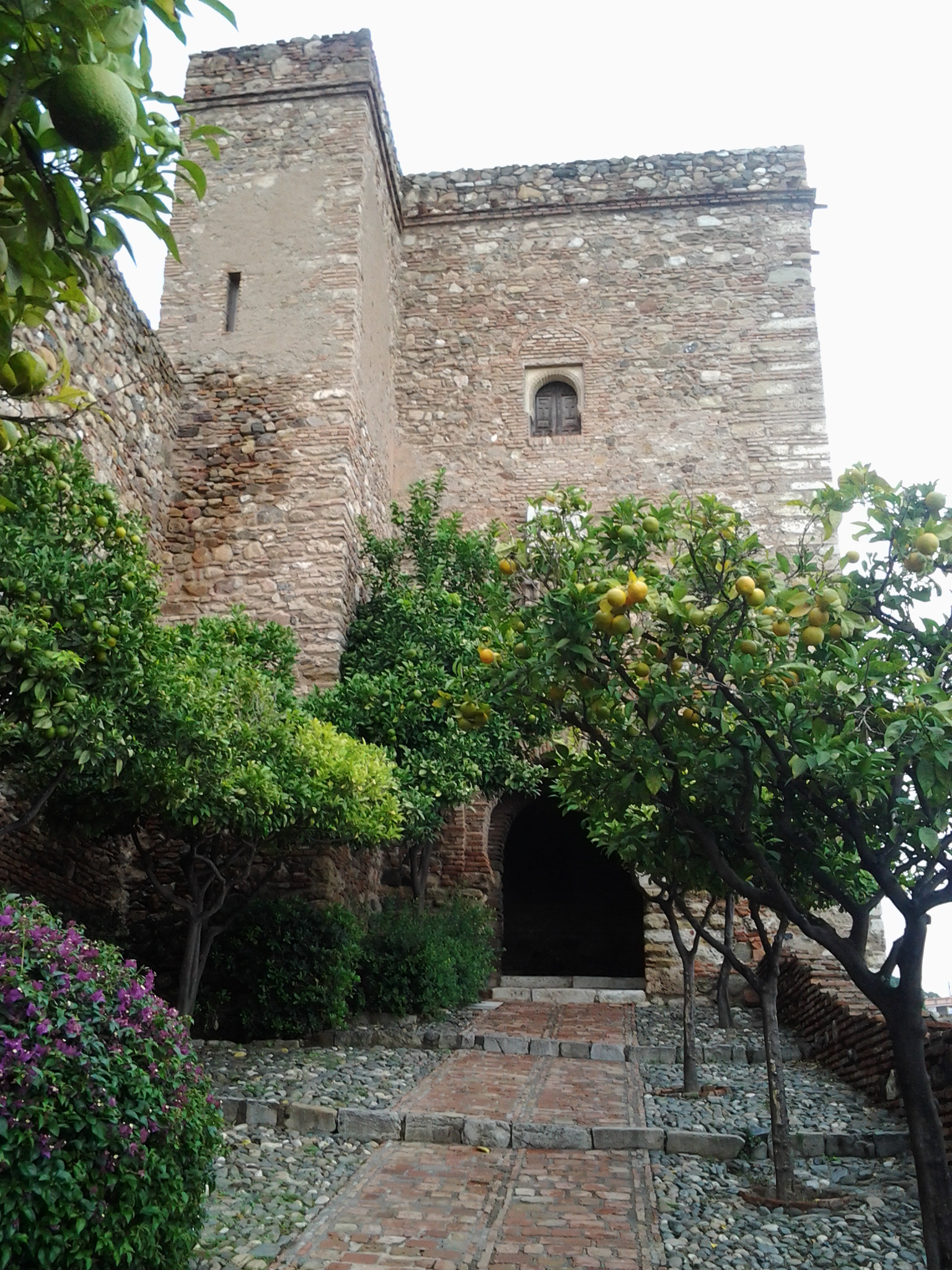
Puerta del Cristo, the final gate to the outer citadel

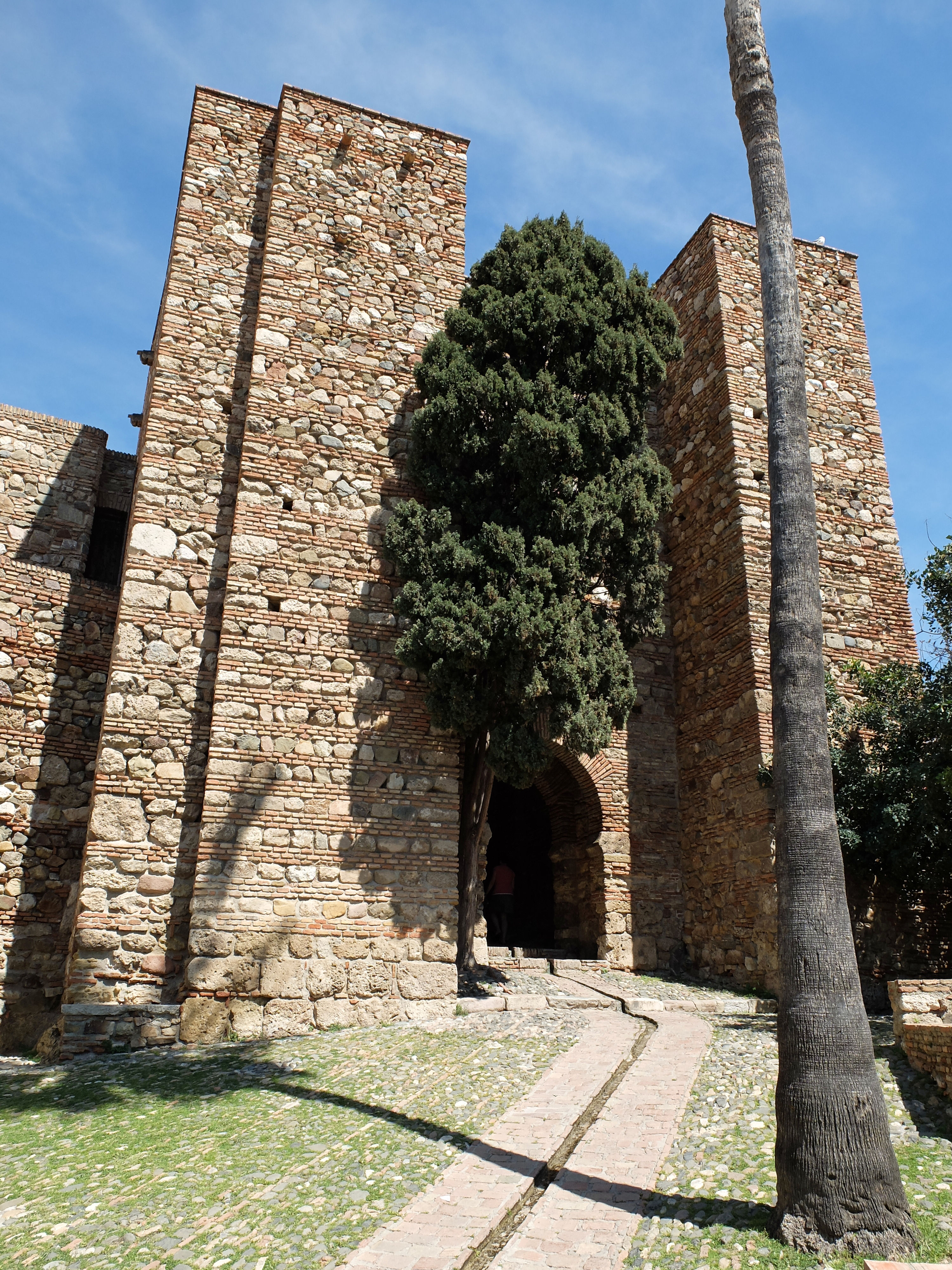
Puerta de los Cuartos de Granada, the entrance to the inner citadel

=== Inner (upper) citadel ===
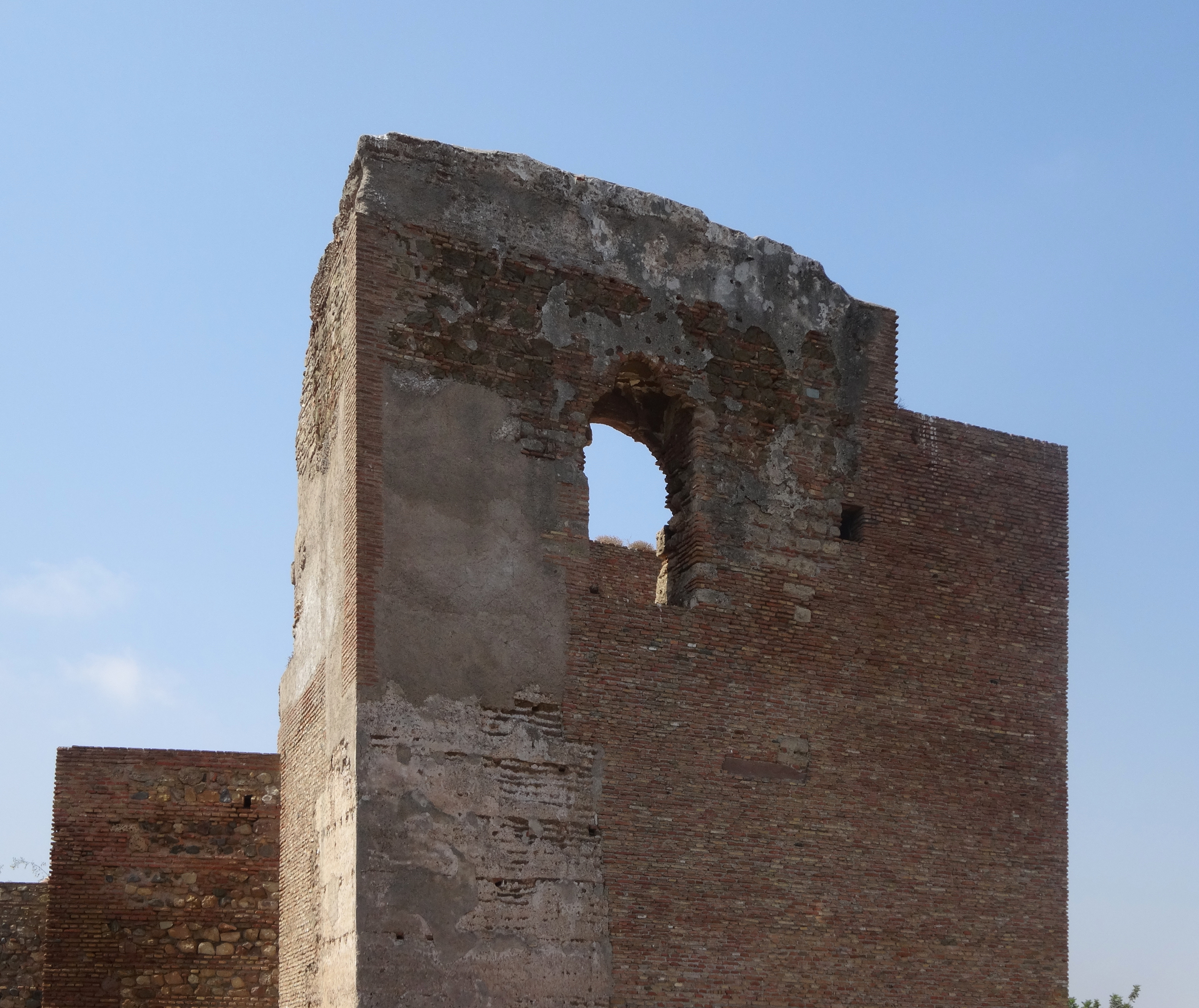
The Torre del Homenaje

The inner or upper enclosure can only be accessed through the Puerta de los Cuartos de Granada ('Gate of the Granada Quarters', also known as the Puerta de los Arcos) a heavily-fortified gate on the western side of the enclosure. This gate is flanked by towers and has a straight passage with two doorways, between which is a small space open to the sky where defenders could attack intruders from above. The gate fell into ruin over the centuries and was largely demolished in 1854; the current structure was reconstructed in the 20th century with the help of historical illustrations. On the eastern side of the inner citadel is the large Torre del Homenaje ('Tower of Tribute'), built during the 11th century but rebuilt in the Nasrid period. During the 20th-century restoration campaigns the tower was preserved instead of reconstructed. Inside the inner citadel is a series of courtyard residences known as the Cuartos de Granada (Quarters of Granada) which served as the home of the kings and governors.

==== Taifa-period palace ====
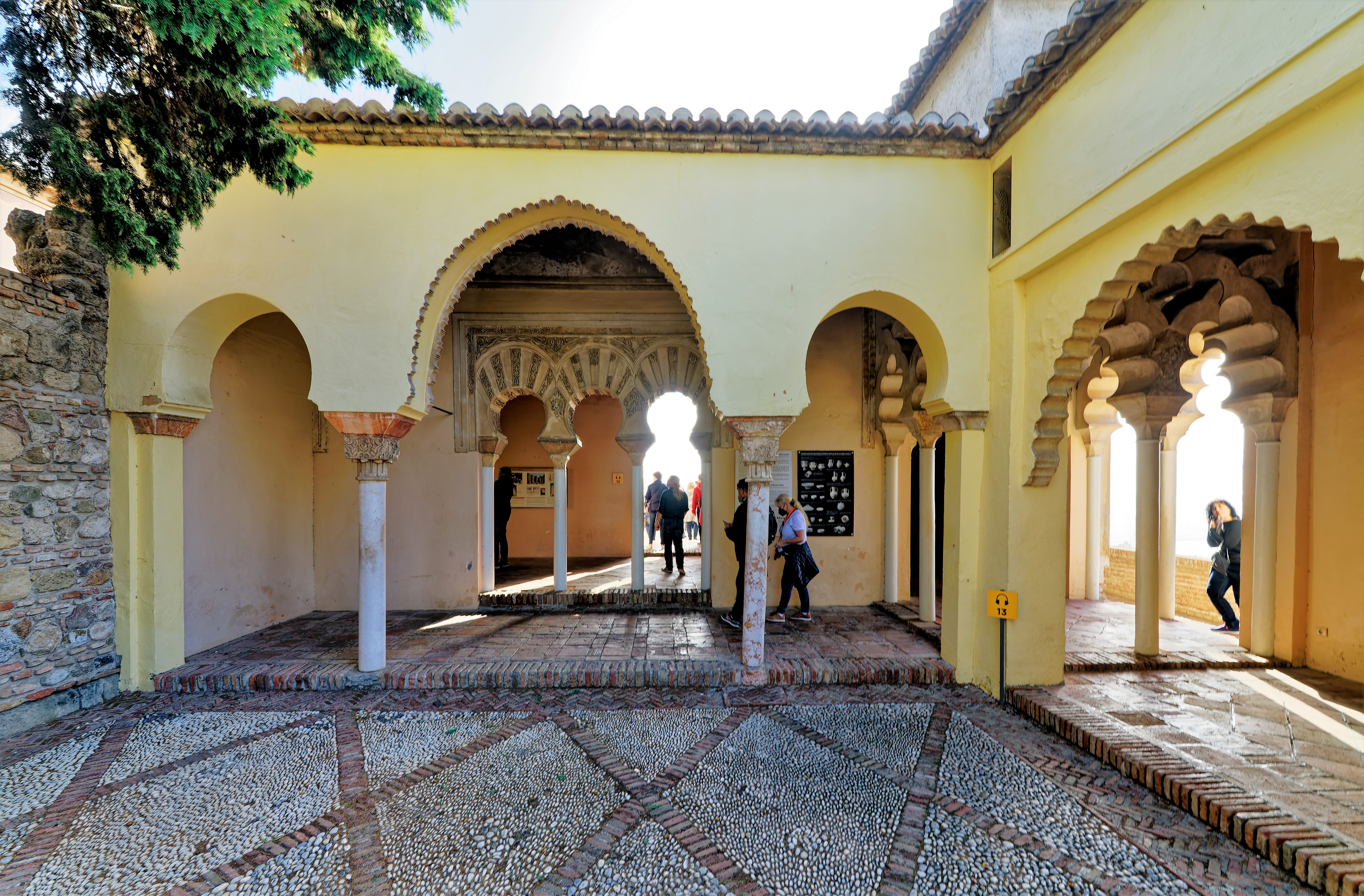
The southern pavilion of the Taifa palace (seen from the courtyard side)

The Taifa palace

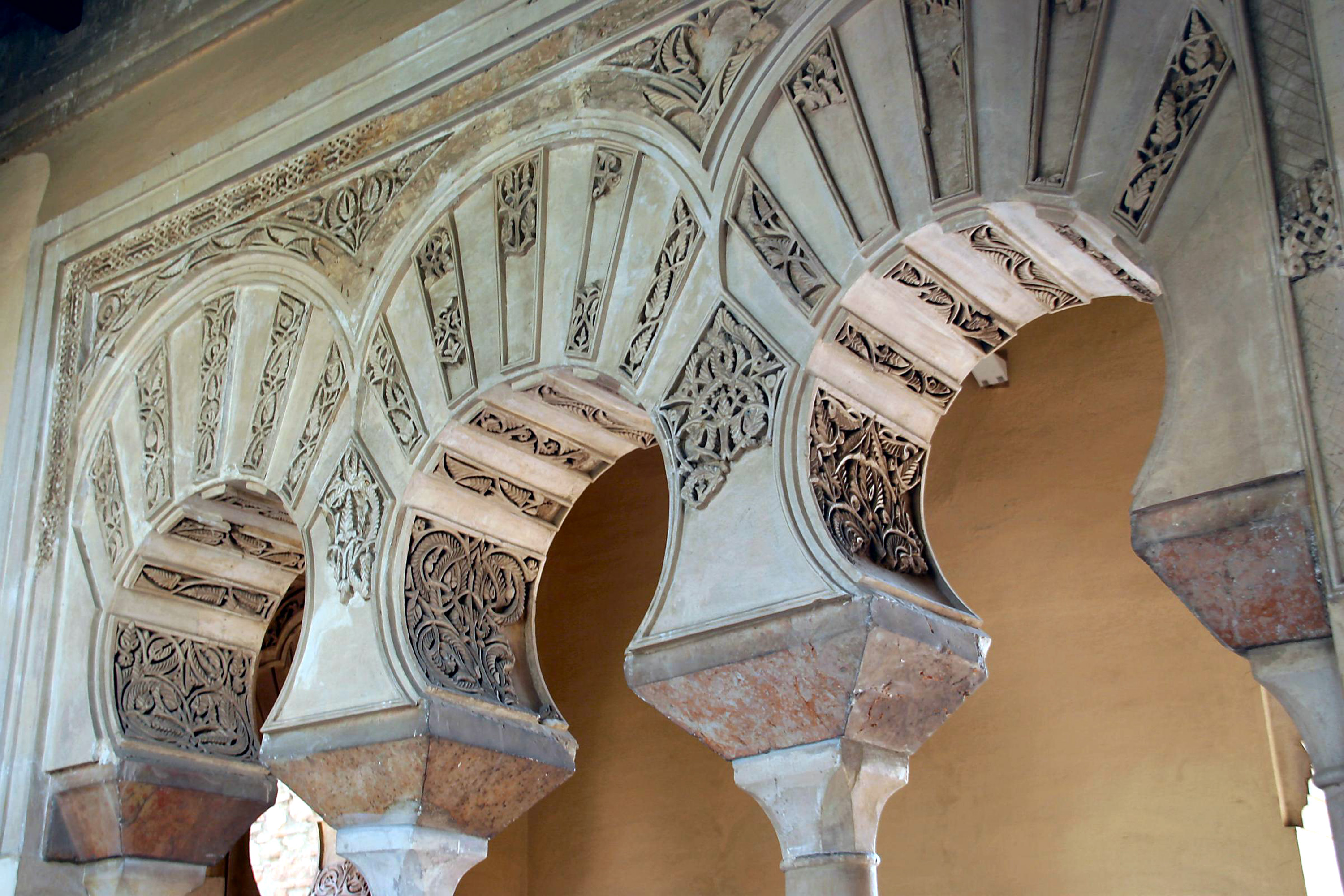
Caliphal-style horseshoe arches at the entrance of the main hall

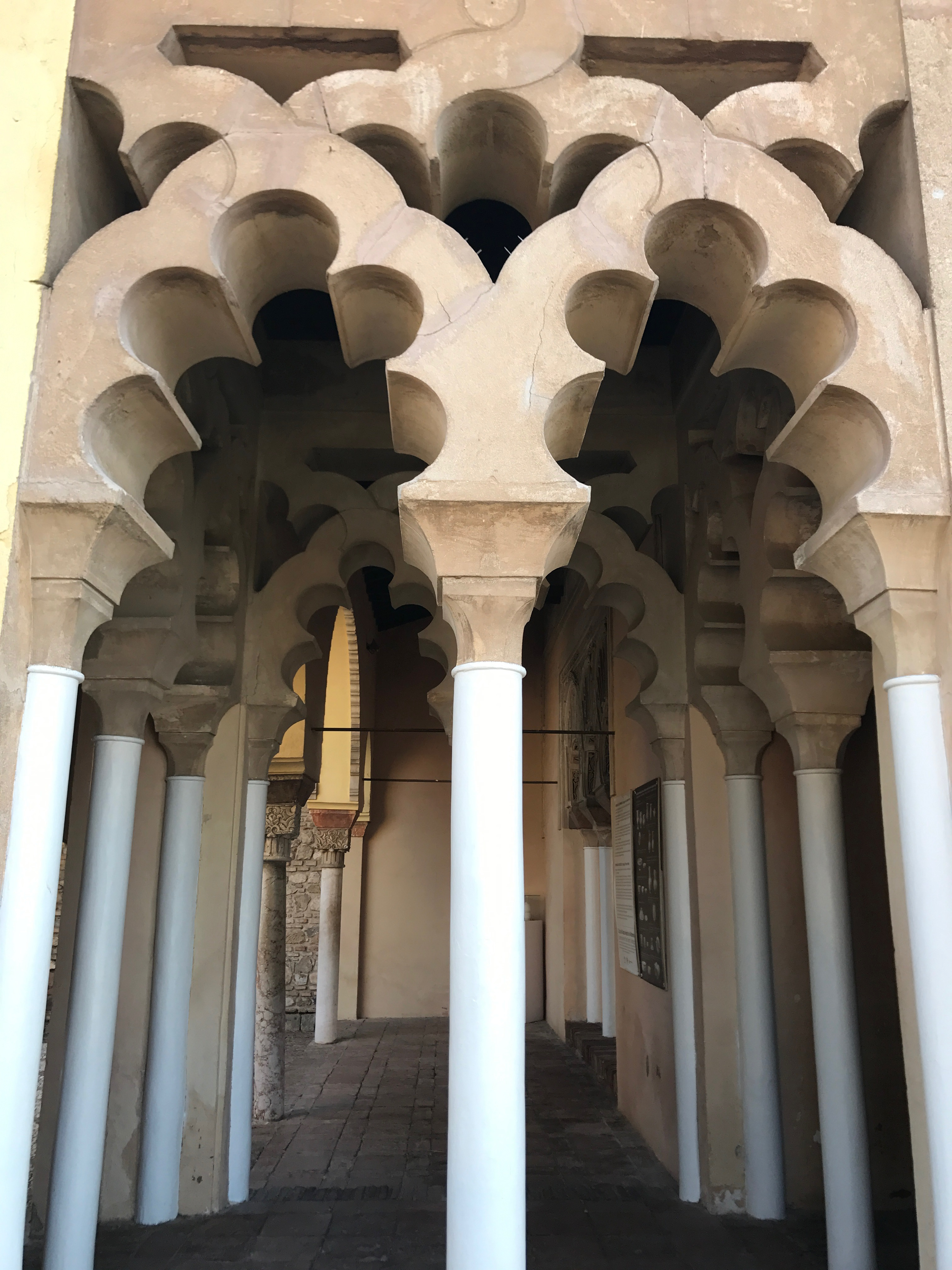
Intersecting multifoil arches in the side annex

The first (southernmost) of them is the only one that dates to the Taifa period (11th century). The northern wing of this palace has disappeared and is replaced by trees today. Only the southern wing or pavilion remain standing, though it was also heavily restored by Leopoldo Torres Balbás in the early 20th century. This pavilion has an inner façade (facing north to the former courtyard) and is entered via a wide portico with arches, restored by Torres Balbás in a Nasrid style but possibly standing on top of original remains. Behind this is a small rectangular chamber entered via another arcade with three horseshoe arches. The arches are supported by two columns in the middle and two engaged columns on the sides and are decorated with carved arabesque decorations, with alternating plain and decorated voussoirs. This arcade reflects the earlier caliphal style of Madinat al-Zahra (10th-century), but in a much smaller and simpler form. This element may date from the early days of Hammudid rule in the city, under Yahya I (r. 1021-1036).

Adjacent on the southwest side of the main chamber and portico is a small annex. A square chamber at the entrance of this annex is surrounded on all four sides by pairs of intersecting multifoil arches, although the arches on the southwest side (looking towards the city and the sea) were created by Torres Balbás. These multifoil arches are similar to the precedents found in the 10th-century expansion of the Great Mosque of Cordoba but they are simpler and serve a more strictly decorative purpose, foreshadowing the more elaborate arches of the later 11th-century Aljaferia Palace in Zaragoza.

Directly behind the southern pavilion is an outer fortification tower known as the Torre de Maldonado, which was remodeled by the Almohads in the 12th-13th century, with vestiges of decoration from this era. Across from it, to the northeast, is a large chamber dating from the 16th century (after the Christian conquest) and featuring a wooden Mudéjar ceiling. Today it houses a model of the Alcazaba.

==== Nasrid palace and houses ====
The Nasrid palace

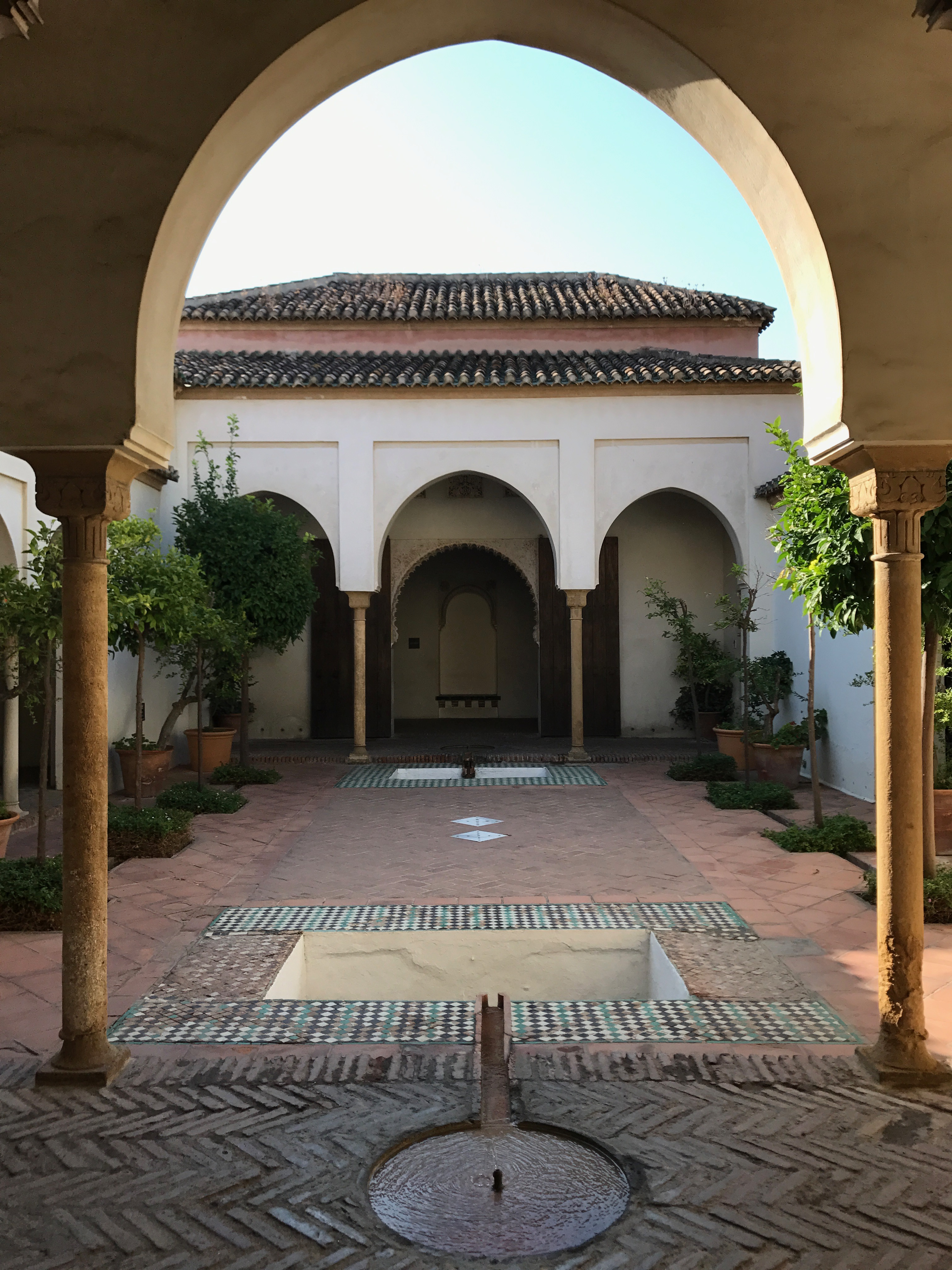
The Patio de los Naranjos

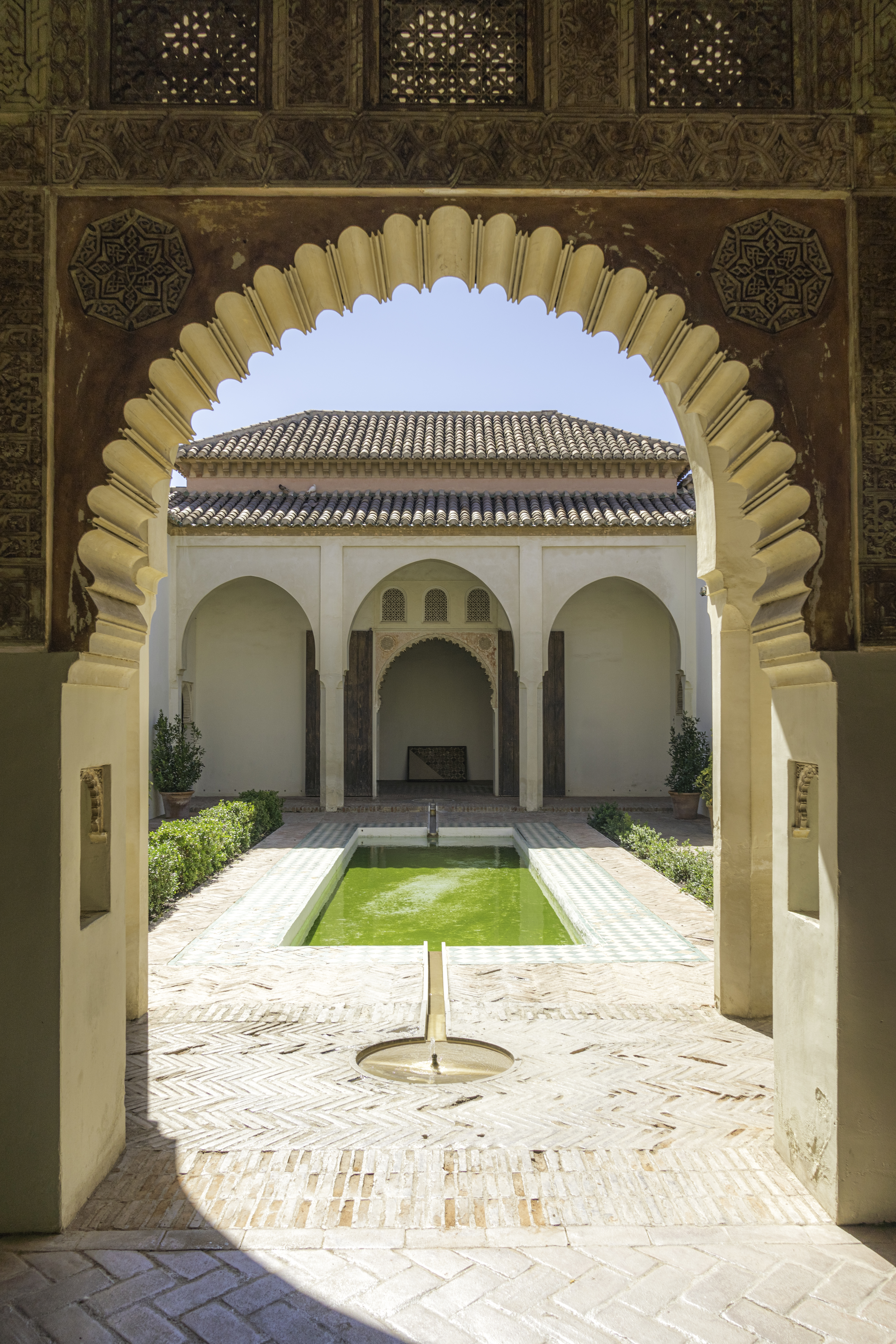
The Patio de la Alberca

The rest of the area northeast of the Taifa palace is occupied by a Nasrid palace with various rooms and porticos arranged around two rectangular courtyards. Most of this palace was reconstructed or restored in the 20th century on the basis of archeological remains. The first (southern) courtyard, known as the Patio de los Naranjos ('Courtyard of the Orange Trees'), has preserved two original pools and their paved tile decoration. The second (northern) courtyard, known as the Patio de la Alberca ('Courtyard of the Pool'), has one long central pool, again surrounded by original tile paving. On the northeast side of this section is another courtyard, the Patio del Aljibe, which may or may not have been part of the Nasrid palace as well. It is now occupied by the restoration workshop of the Alcazaba. It is named after a cistern built under it with an area of approximately 25 square metres (270 sq ft).

The rest of the space between the Nasrid palace and the Torre del Homenaje is occupied by the so-called Barrio Castrense ('Military District'), thought to date from the 11th century and to have been inhabited by the ruler's other officials and servants. It is one of the best-preserved areas of the citadel due to the fact that it was not rebuilt or repurposed in later centuries, but it is not open to the public today. The area contains eight houses connected by narrow streets. Some of the houses were reconstructed in the 20th century while others were preserved and are sheltered by a protective roof. One of the largest houses has its own hammam (bath facility) and toilets.

== See also ==
- Taifa of Málaga
- Moorish architecture
- Spanish architecture
