= El Bañuelo =

Historic site in Granada, Spain

Coordinates: 37°10′42.4″N 03°35′34.7″W

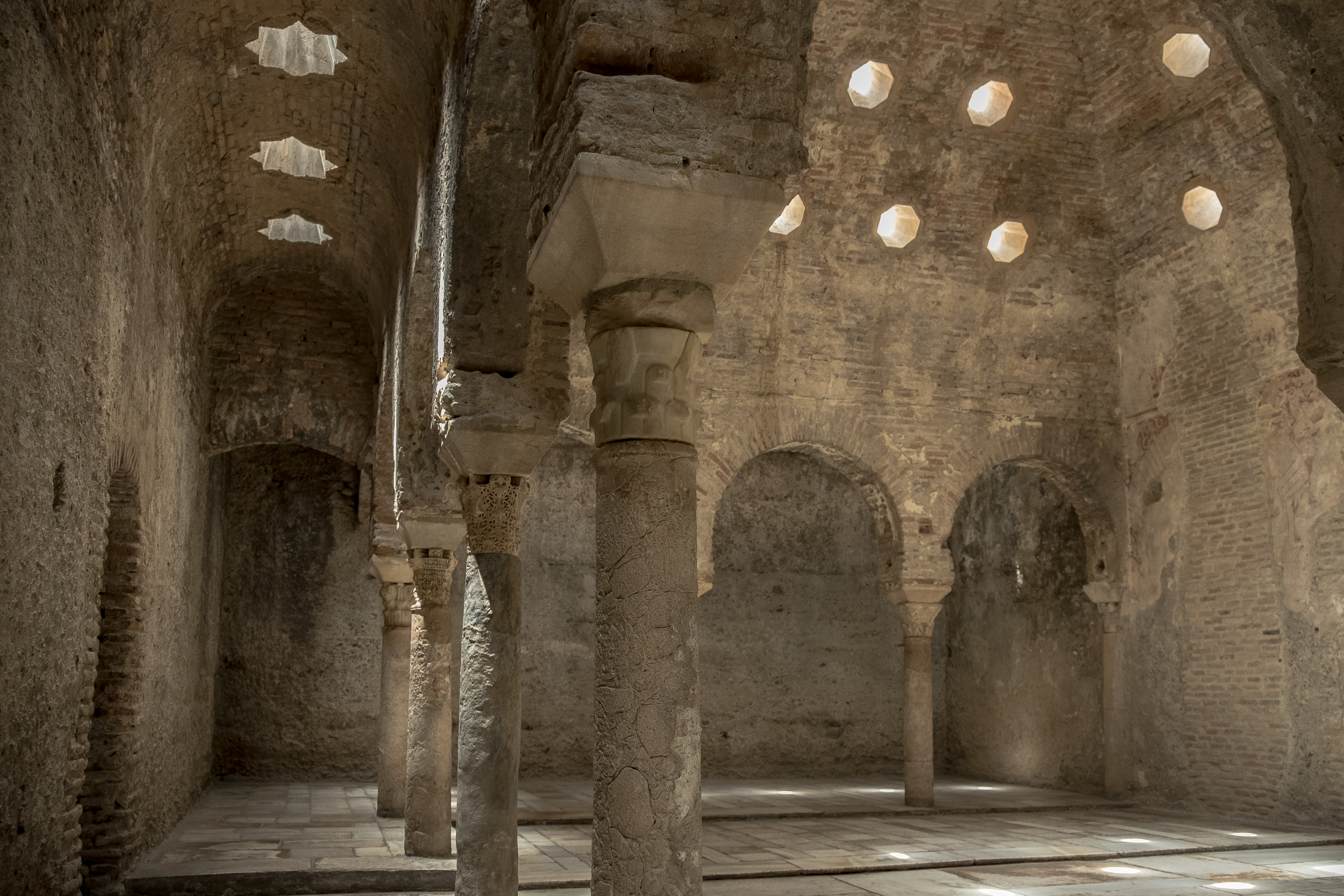
Interior of the Bañuelo bath complex, showing the bayt al-wasṭānī (the warm room), the largest and central chamber

The Bañuelo or El Bañuelo (a diminutive of Spanish baño "bath"), also known as the Baño del Nogal ("Bath of the Walnut") or Hammam al-Yawza (Arabic: حمام الجوزة), is a preserved historic hammam (Islamic bathhouse) in Granada, Spain, dating from the 11th or 12th century. It is located in the Albaicin quarter of the city, on the banks of the Darro River. It was used as a bathhouse until the 16th century, before becoming defunct and converted to other uses. In the 20th century it underwent restorations and is now a tourist attraction.

== History ==
Bathhouses (hammams) of this type were a common feature of Muslim cities across the Muslim world, serving both a social and religious purpose. They assisted Muslims in the performance of ablutions, especially the full-body ablutions or ghusl, which were required for certain situations. They also served the general purpose of hygiene as well as being a place for socialization. Their layout and function was modeled on the Roman bathhouses which preceded them and which had already been part of urban life in the region for generations.

About a dozen historic remains of Islamic bathhouses (hammams) have been found in Granada, though most are of modest form, with the exception of the lavish 14th-century Comares Baths in the Alhambra. The Bañuelo is the only hammam in Granada, outside the Alhambra, which has been restored and made accessible to the public. It is traditionally dated to the time of the Zirids (a Taifa kingdom based in Granada) in the 11th century, during the reign of Badis or Abdallah, based on an early study by Leopoldo Torres Balbás. Later researchers have suggested that the building dates from the 12th century or later, based on its layout and the style of its masonry. The baths would have been located inside the al-Qasaba al-Qadima or Old Alcazaba, the former royal citadel located over what later became the Albaicin, before the Alhambra became the seat of power.

After the fall of Granada to Spanish Catholic in 1492, at the end of the Reconquista, the bathhouse continued to be repaired and maintained during the 16th century as it continued to be used by the city's morisco population. In later centuries the baths ceased their original function and were used as a public laundry facility and later as a dwelling (a later residential structure was built over a part of the structure, fronting the street). In 1918 the site was declared a Cultural Heritage Property of Spain, and in 1927-28 Torres Balbás carried out the first restoration works. Restoration works continued throughout the 20th century, and the building is currently open as a tourist and historic site.

== Architecture ==
The baths consisted of several main rooms arranged in sequence. The first room, upon entering from the street, was a reception or relaxation room centered around a square water basin. Although today this room is open to the sky, it was once covered by a large wooden cupola ceiling. At its southwest corner a doorway led to three small rooms with latrines, while a doorway to at its northwestern corner led to the changing room (equivalent to the ancient Roman apodyterium). From here visitors entered the steam rooms, which consisted of three chambers: the cold room (bayt al-bārid), the warm room (bayt al-wasṭānī), and the hot room (bayt al-sakhūn). These corresponded, respectively, to the Roman equivalents of the frigidarium, tepidarium, and caldarium. Bathers visited the cold room first, then moved progressively to the warm room and then the hot room, whose purpose was to induce perspiration as part of the cleaning or purification process. Visitors were also cleaned with vigorous rubbing and massaging by bathhouse staff. As was common to other Muslim hammams, and in contrast with other versions of steam baths, bathers did not actually immerse themselves in water but instead washed themselves at the end of the process by having warm water poured onto them.

In the Bañuelo the largest room is the warm room (bayt al-wasṭānī) at the middle of the complex. This feature of the layout was also common to many other bathhouses in al-Andalus. It is covered by a large central vault or dome ceiling surrounded on three sides by smaller barrel vault sections, all of which rested on marble columns between horseshoe arches. Many of the capitals of the columns were reused from structures of earlier periods, including the Roman period and Caliphal period. The ceilings are pierced with small star-shaped and octagonal skylights, which provided lighting and could allow excess steam to escape. Both the cold room which preceded it and the hot room which followed it were rectangular rooms covered by barrel vaults, again pierced with skylights, and marked at either end by a column between two horseshoe arches. Beyond the hot room was the service area of the baths which was set lower than the other rooms and contained the furnace and boiler. This furnace provided hot water for the steam rooms, and also generated hot air and smoke which was then channeled through pipes and conduits under the floors of the hot and warm rooms (similar to the Roman hypocaust system) before being evacuated through the walls and up to the chimneys.

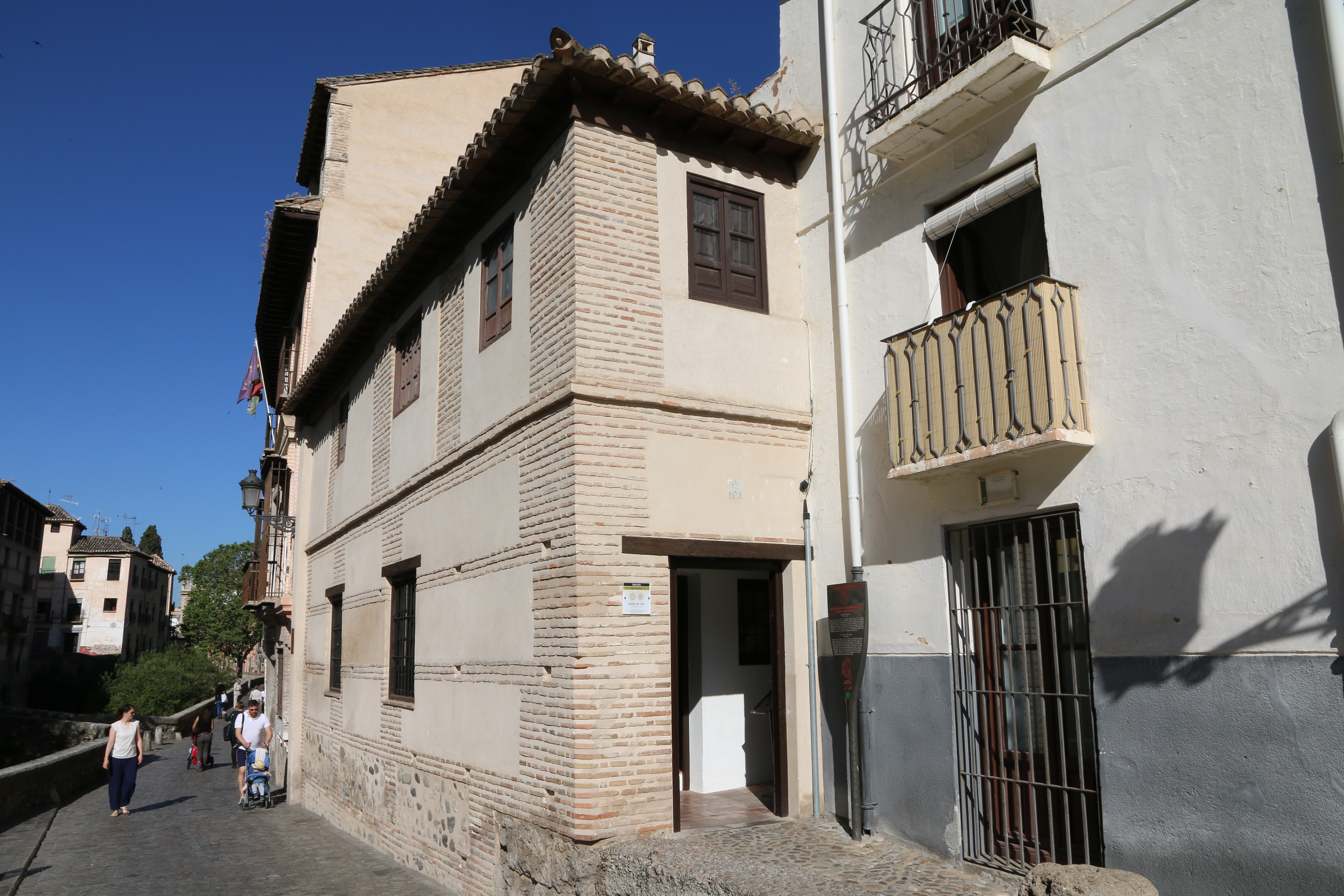
The street entrance of the bathhouse today

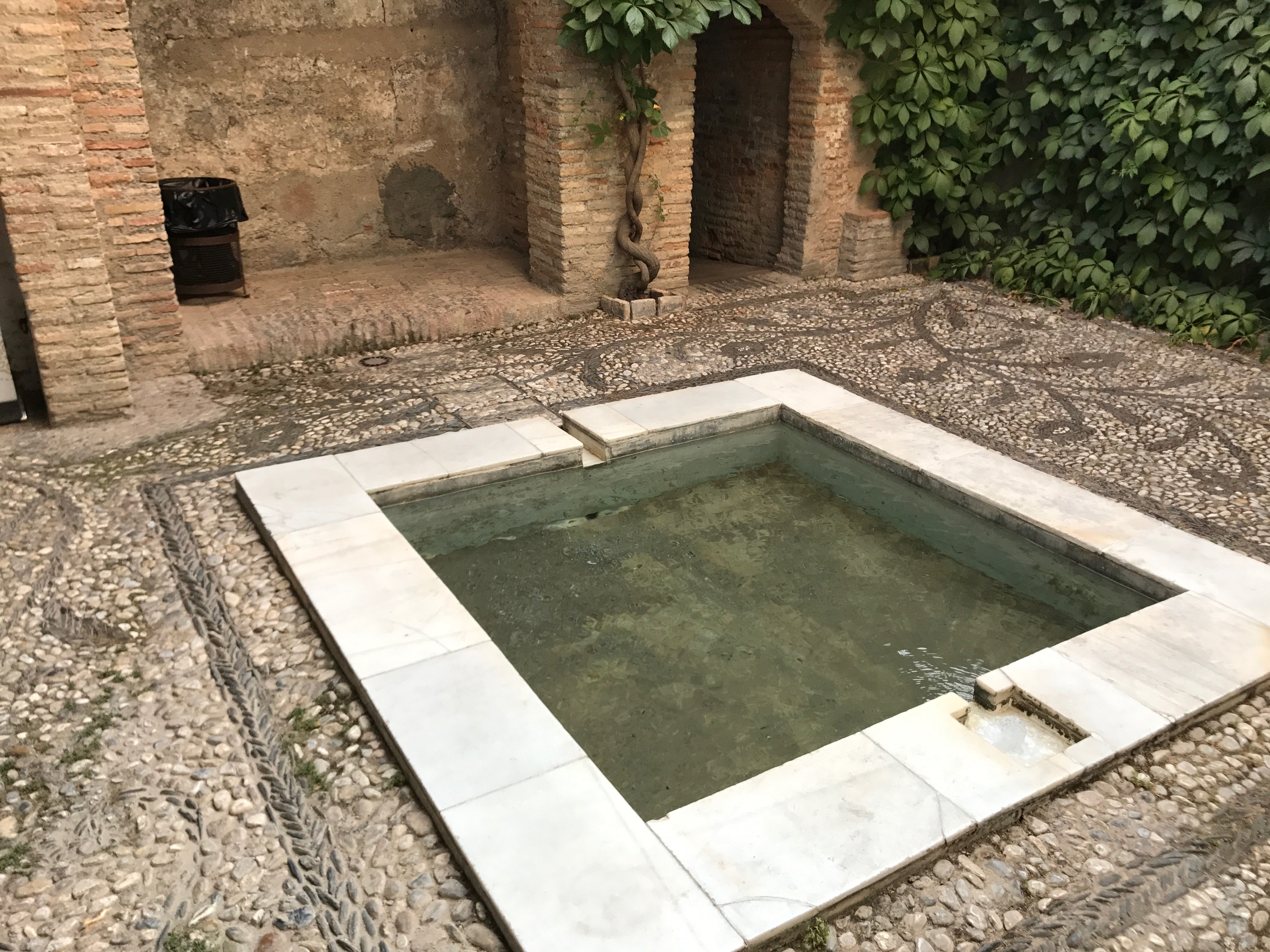
The water basin in the relaxation room at the entrance of the complex

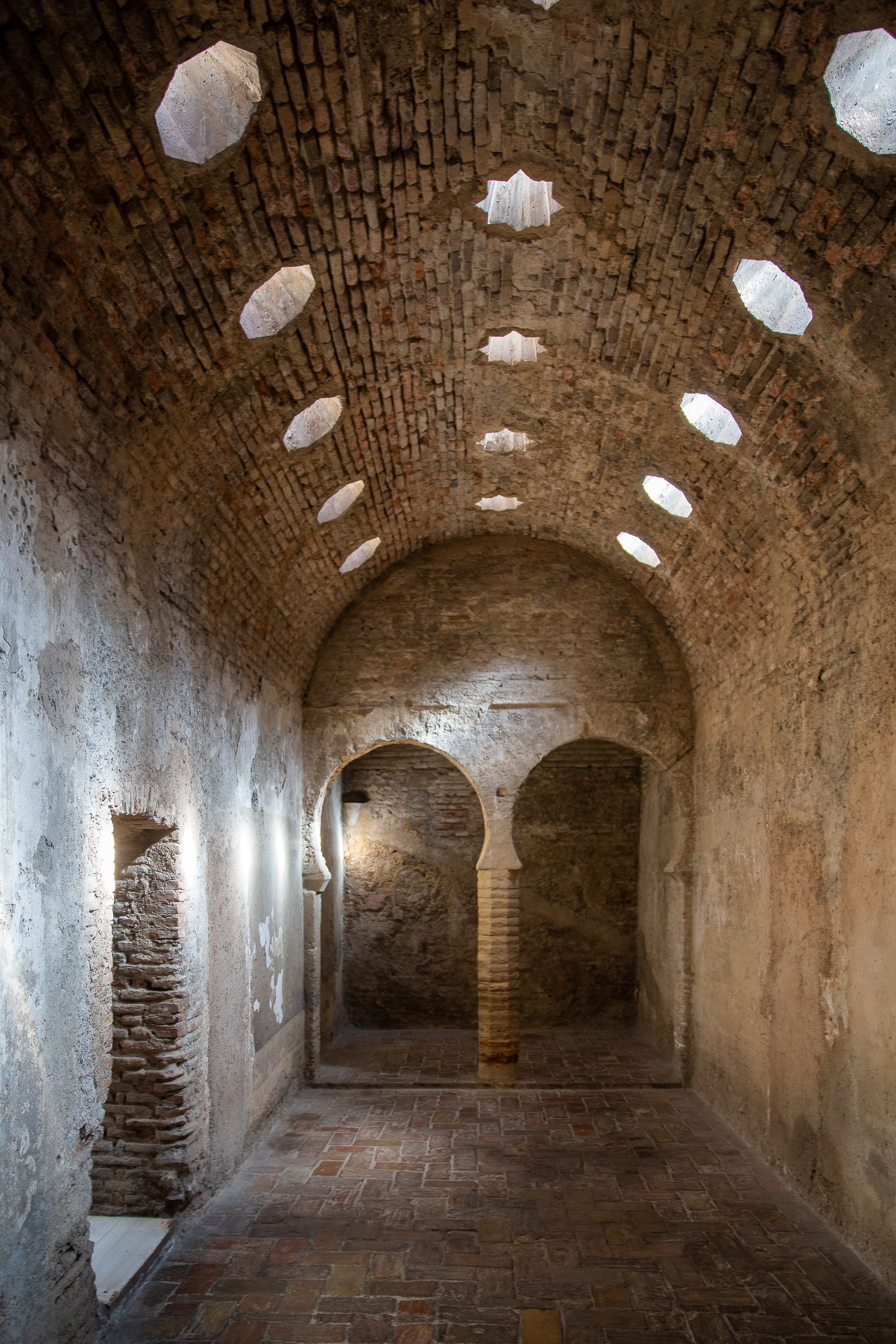
The cold room (bayt al-bārid)

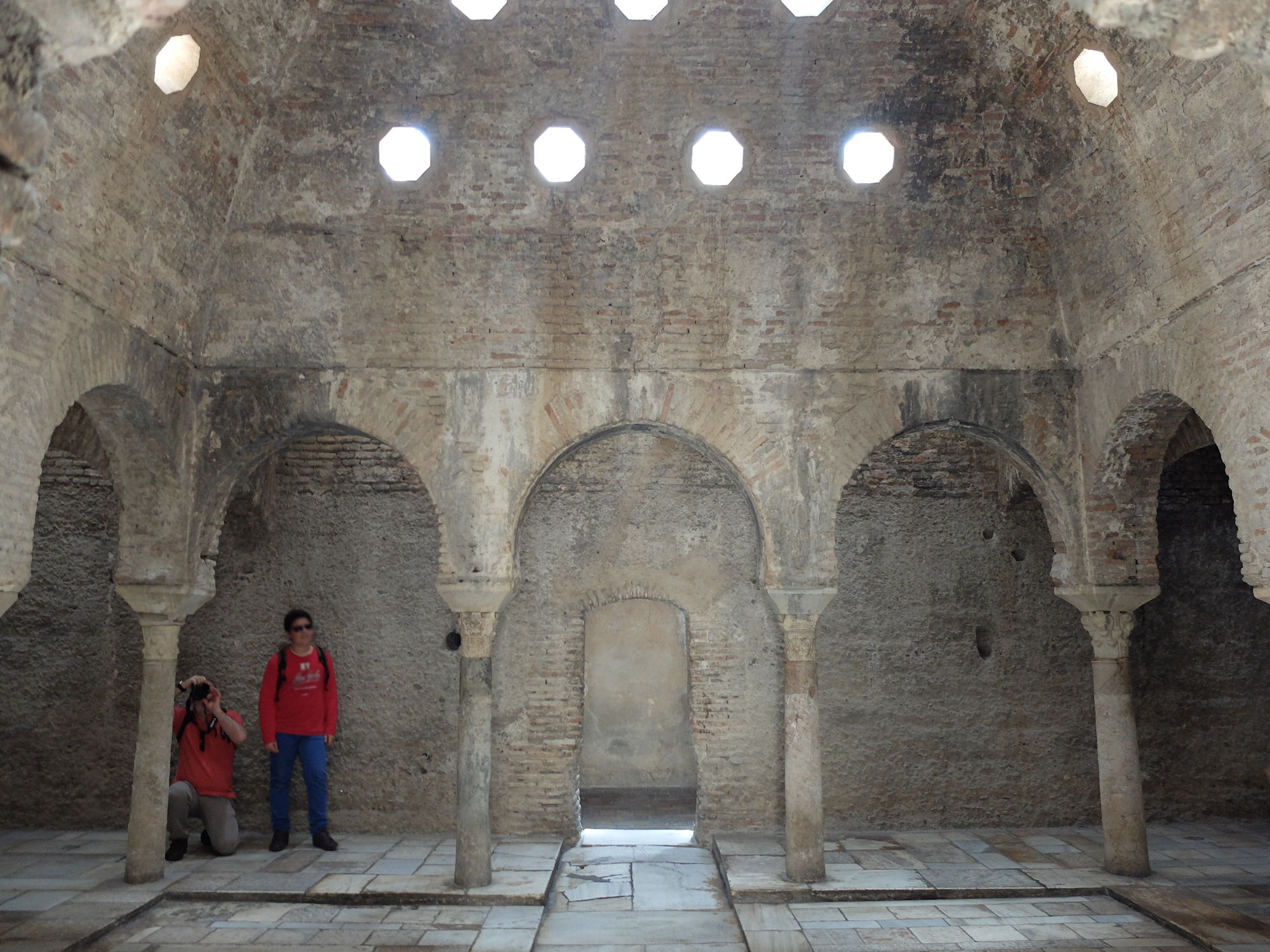
The warm room or central room (bayt al-wasṭānī) of the bathhouse

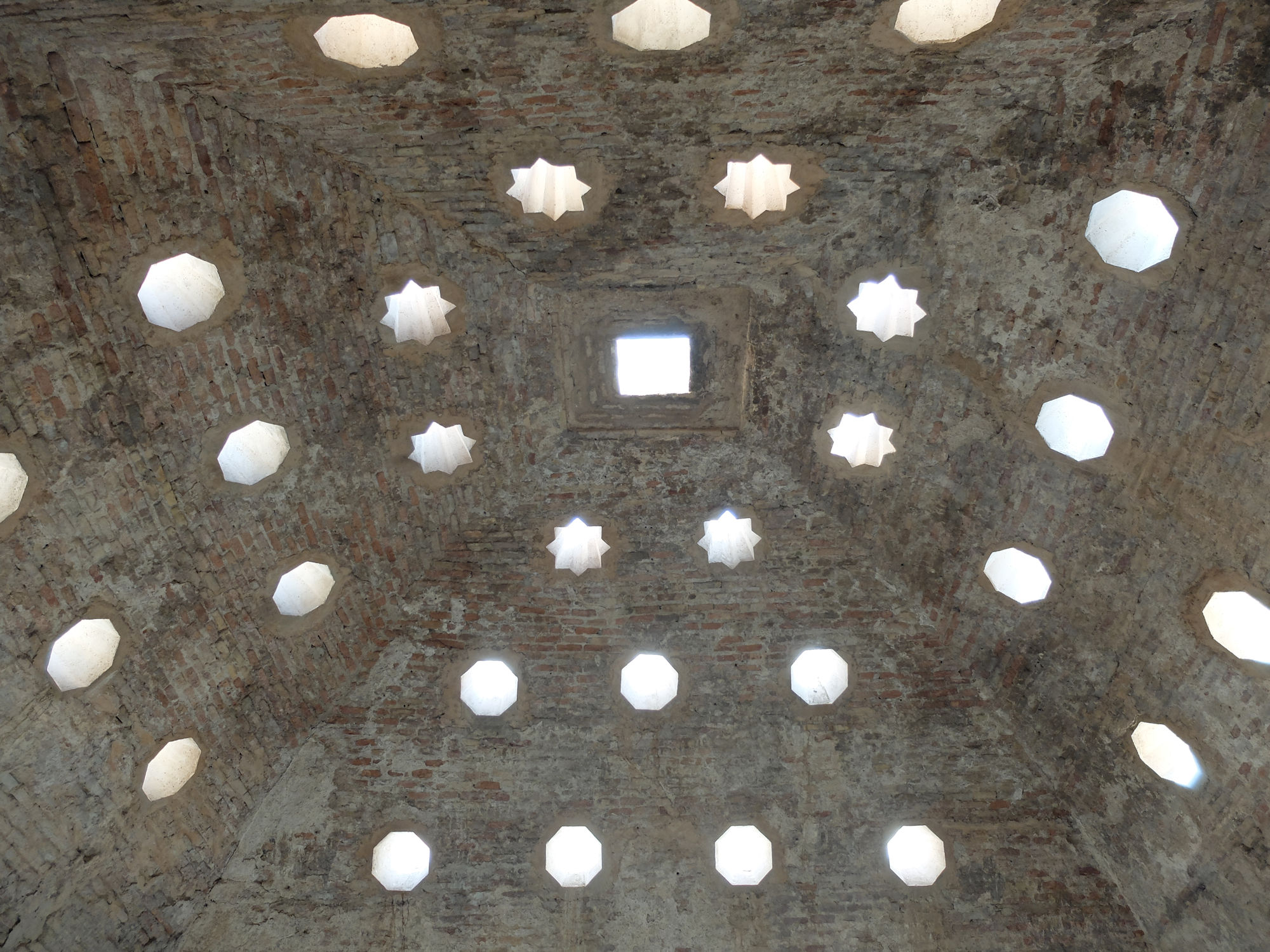
The vaulted ceiling of the warm room and its skylights

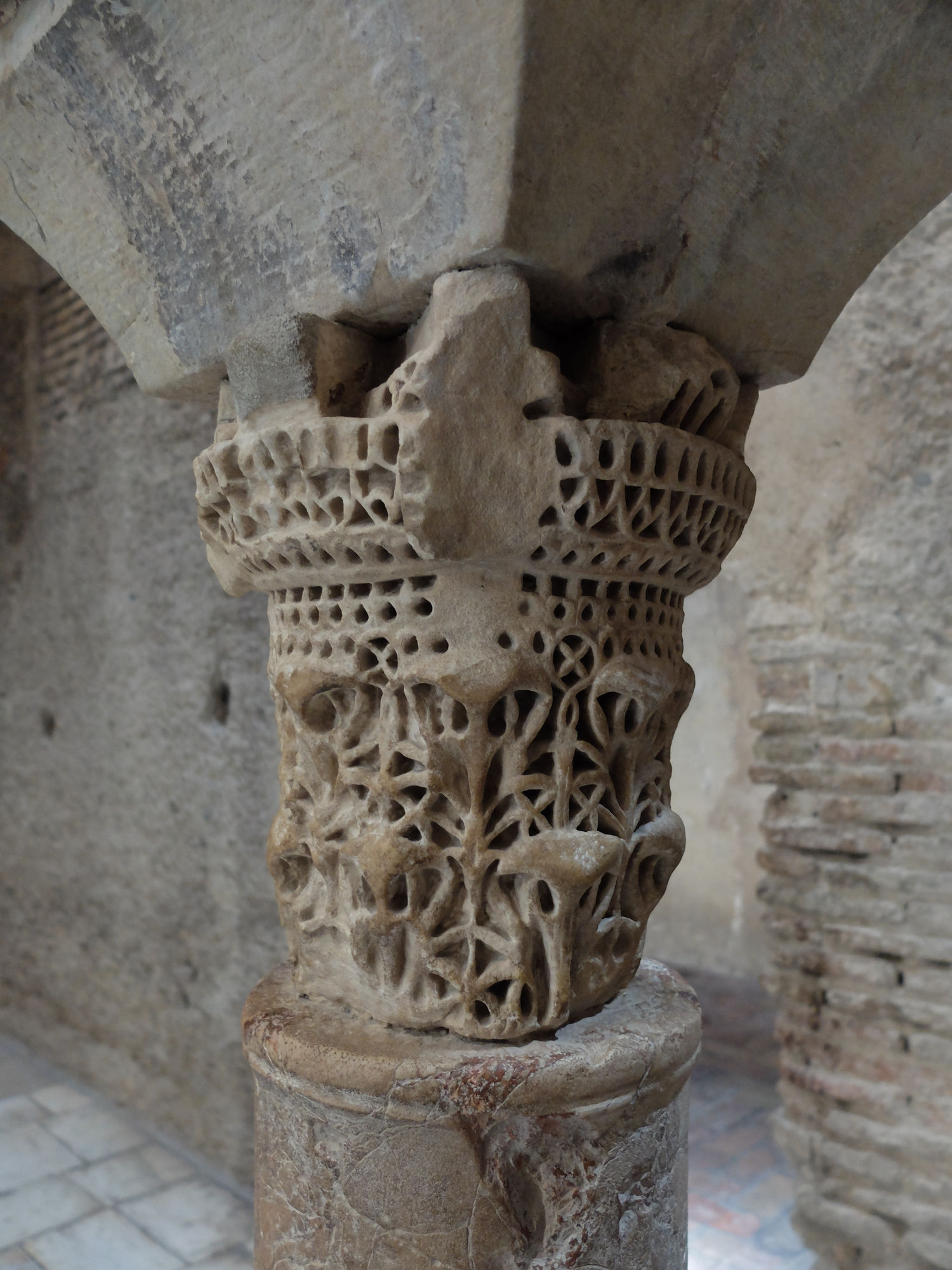
A Caliphate-era capital, one of several older capitals reused in this part of the baths

== See also ==
- Caliphal Baths
- Arab Baths of Jaén
- Hammam Saffarin
