= Arab Baths of Jaén =

Cultural property in Jaén, Spain

Coordinates: 37°46′15.8″N 03°47′38.7″W

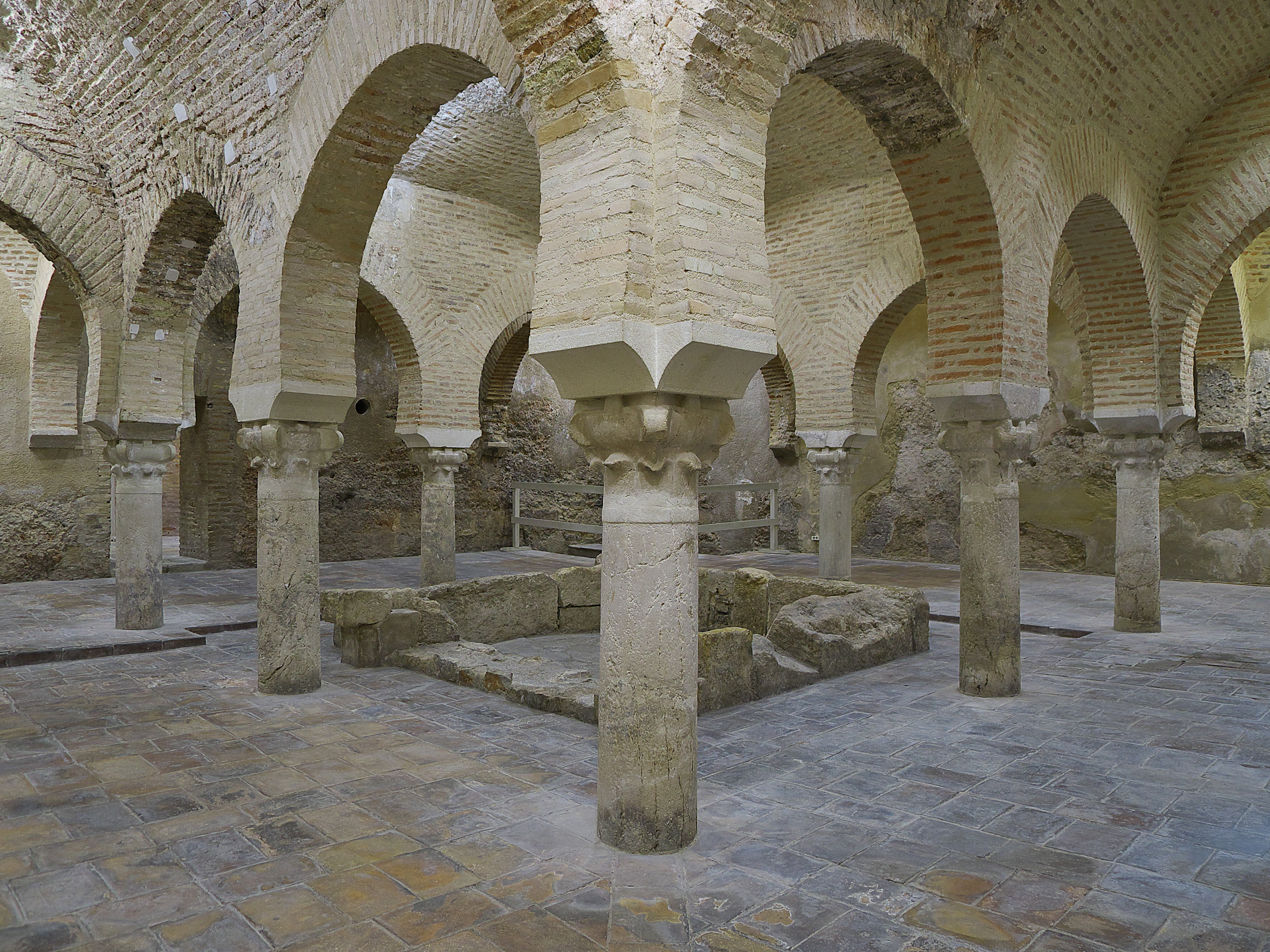
The large central warm room (bayt al-wasti) of the bathhouse

The Arab Baths of Jaén (Spanish: Baños Árabes de Jaén) also known as Baño del Niño (Hamman al-Walad) are a well-preserved historic hammam (Islamic bathhouse) located in Jaén, Spain.

== History ==
These baths were one of the five Arab baths known in Jaén (Note: According to 14th century chronicler al-Himyari, in Jaén there were up to five baths: Hamman al-Walad, Hamman al-Tawr, Hamman ibn al-Salim, Hamman ibn Tarafa and Hamman ibn Ishaq. See Cañada 2024. Baños Árabes del Naranjo are on Plaza de los Caños, at the corner with Calle Arroyo de San Pedro, adjoining the historic judería. They are the only other Arab baths open to visits in Jaén. These large baths (about 300 m) were built around the 11th century and were active until Jaén was reconquered by the Castillans in 1246. In the 14th century the building was divided into a bakery - in the area closest to the square - and a dwelling. In the fifteenth century, the place was bought by the City of Jaén and the town's fish market was built on it; some time later, a butcher was installed there. In the eighteenth century this was reformed, a new facade was built and the old facade was modified; this is the present facade, which faces the square. In 1929 the inside of the building is emptied, and a school group is built. Parts of some classrooms remain, as well as the courtyard and the entrance that currently stands in Calle Los Caños. After restoration, the Baño del Naranjo was inaugurated as a visiting place for tourists on 29 September 2021. See "Baños Árabes del Naranjo". jaenparaisointerior.es. See "Baños del Naranjo". aytojaen.es (in Spanish).) They were built over a Roman bath in 1002, near the end of the Caliphate of Córdoba. They may have undergone later alterations, probably in the 12th century. These baths were supplied with water from the spring of the Magdalena, as were the baths known as baños del toro or baños del naranjo.

Following the Christian conquest of the city by Ferdinand III in 1246, the baths remained in use for a while until they were repurposed as tanneries. In the 16th century, Don Fernando Torres de Portugal y Mesía (1st Count of Villardompardo and 7th Viceroy of Peru) had a private palace built for himself on top of the baths, thus hiding them for centuries.

They were only definitively rediscovered by Enrique Romero de Torres in 1913 during a survey of historic buildings in the city. Professor of Archaeology Manuel Gómez-Moreno visited the property 4 years later and, after studying it, proposed it as a National Monument. The site was declared a Cultural Heritage Property of Spain in 1931.

1936 saw the beginning of the first restoration work, directed by Leopoldo Torres Balbás, conservator of the Alhambra in Granada, and Jaén architect Luis Berges Martínez, but the Civil War interrupted the project. In 1970, Luis Berges Roldán, the son of Berges Martínez, was commissioned by the Directorate General of Fine Arts to achieve the first complete restoration of the Arab baths. The work lasted until 1982 and was acclaimed as a success.

The association Europa Nostra awarded in 1984 the medal of honor for the restoration of the baths, accomplished under the responsibility of Roldán. The restoration of the Arab courtyard of the Magdalena church, together with that of the Arab baths of the Palacio de Villardompardo, were nominated for the 1986 Aga Khan Award for Architecture.

Some work was carried out from 2011 to 2013 to increase access of the facilities to disabled people (ramps and such were installed to compensate for the many level differences within the premices), and to create access to two different points that had remained unaccessible.

== Description ==
It is one of the largest known examples of Andalusi bathhouses and is distinguished from others by its particularly large "warm room" (bayt al-wasti).

In 2019, more original 12th century wall paintings were discovered in the vestibule preceding the cold room and on a pendentive of the warm room.

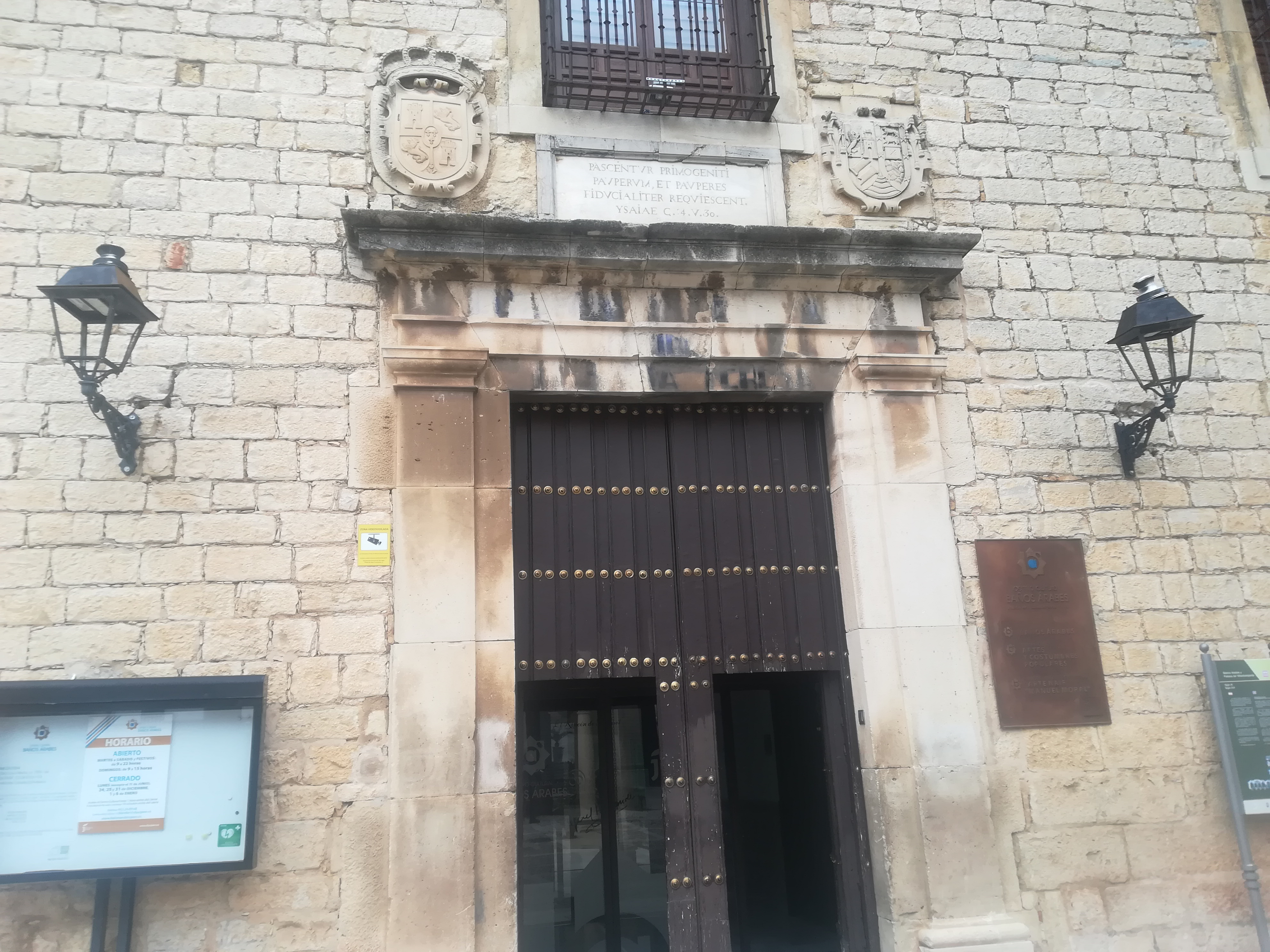
Entrance to the Centro Culturel Baños Árabes

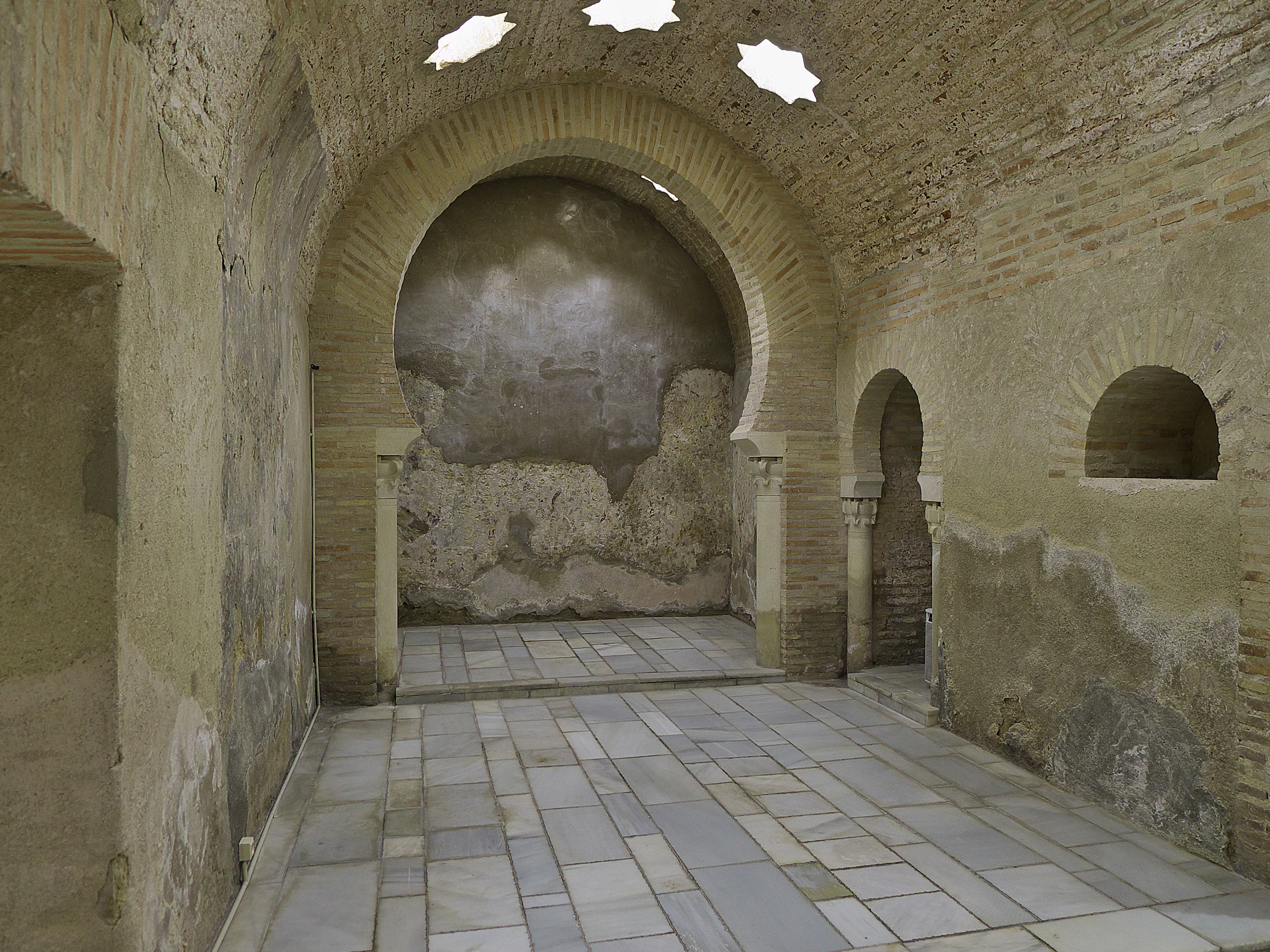
The changing room (bayt al-maslaj) with octagram-shaped skylights

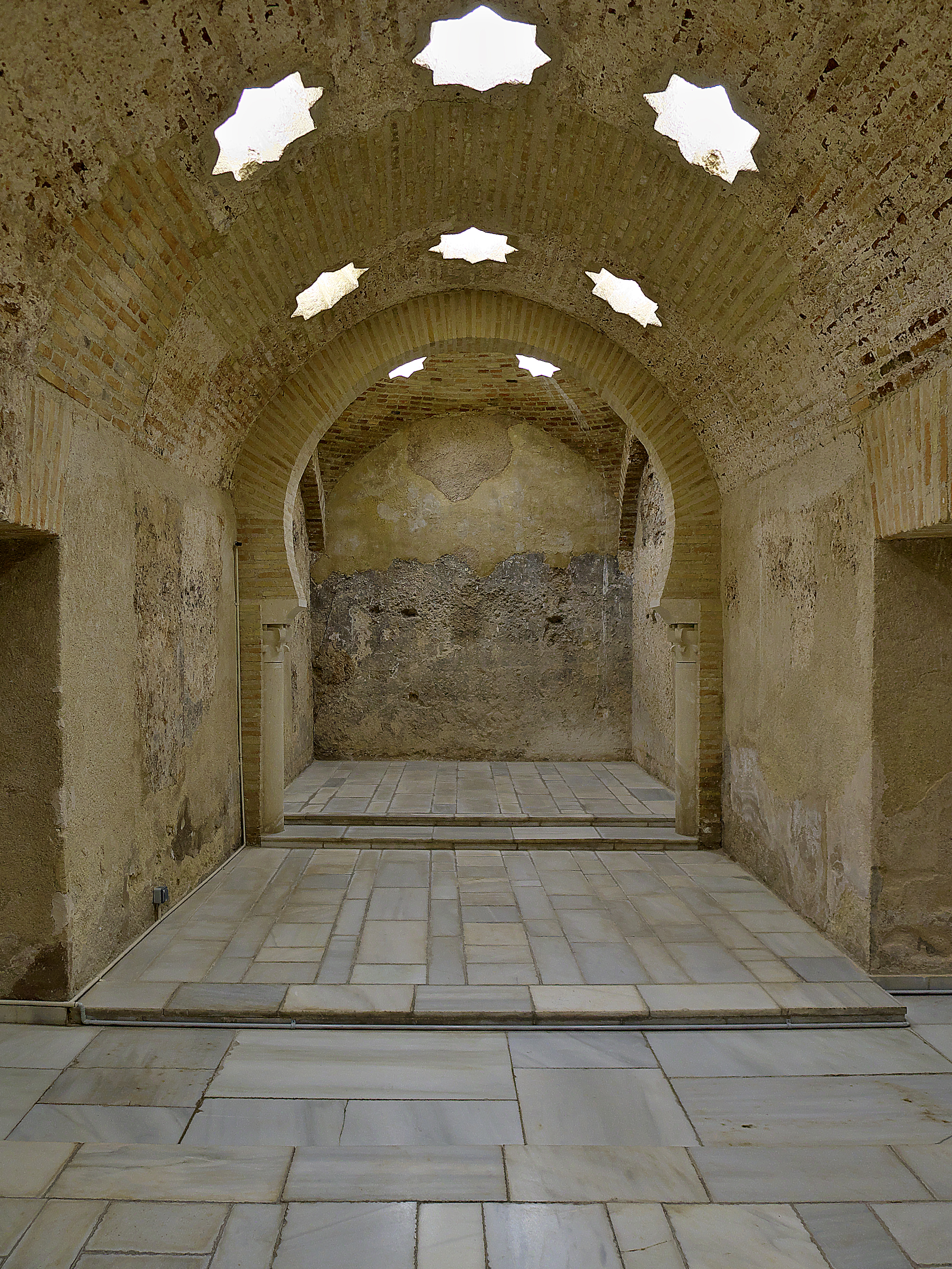
The cold room (bayt al-barid)

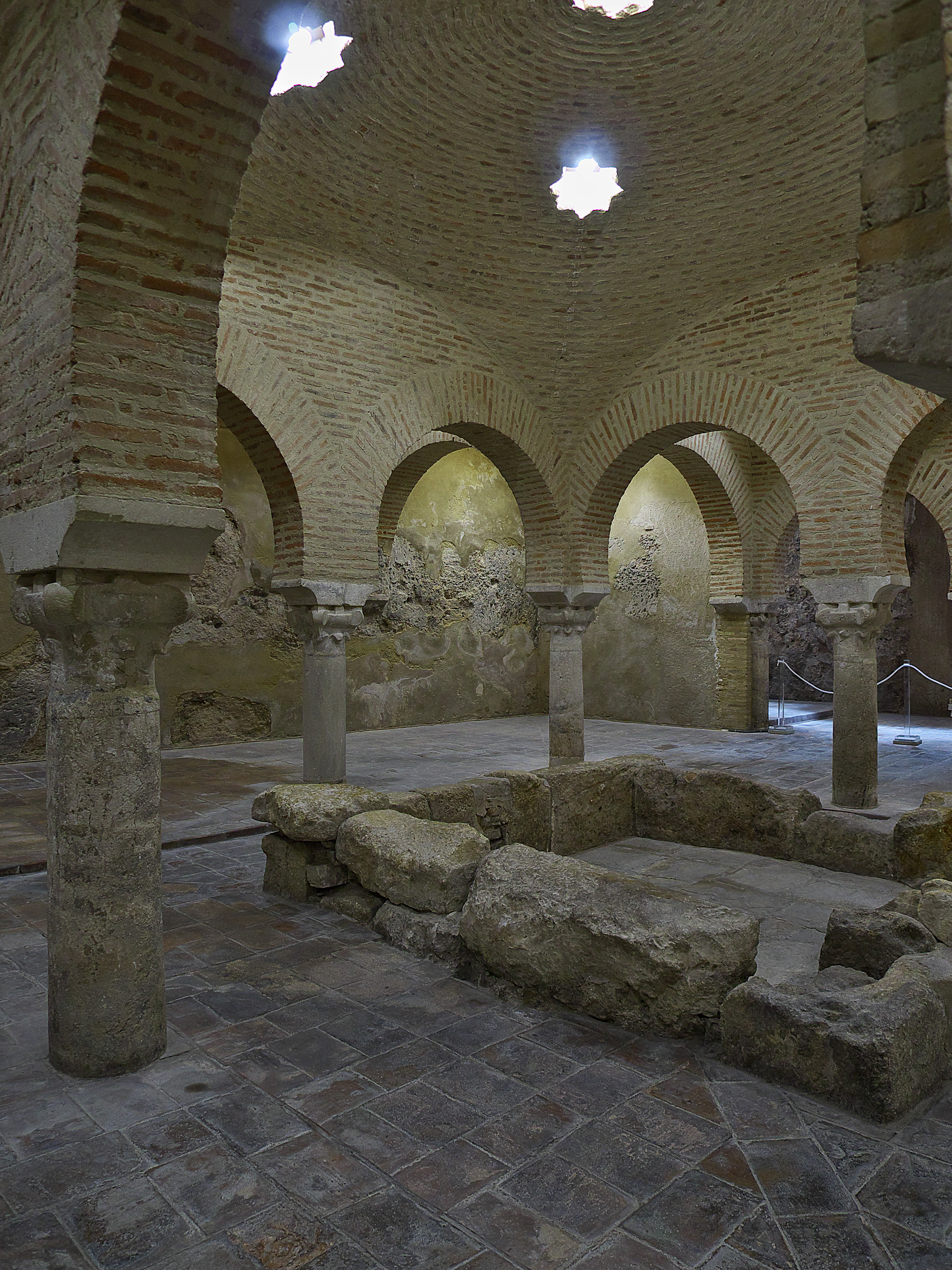
The warm room (bayt al-wasti)

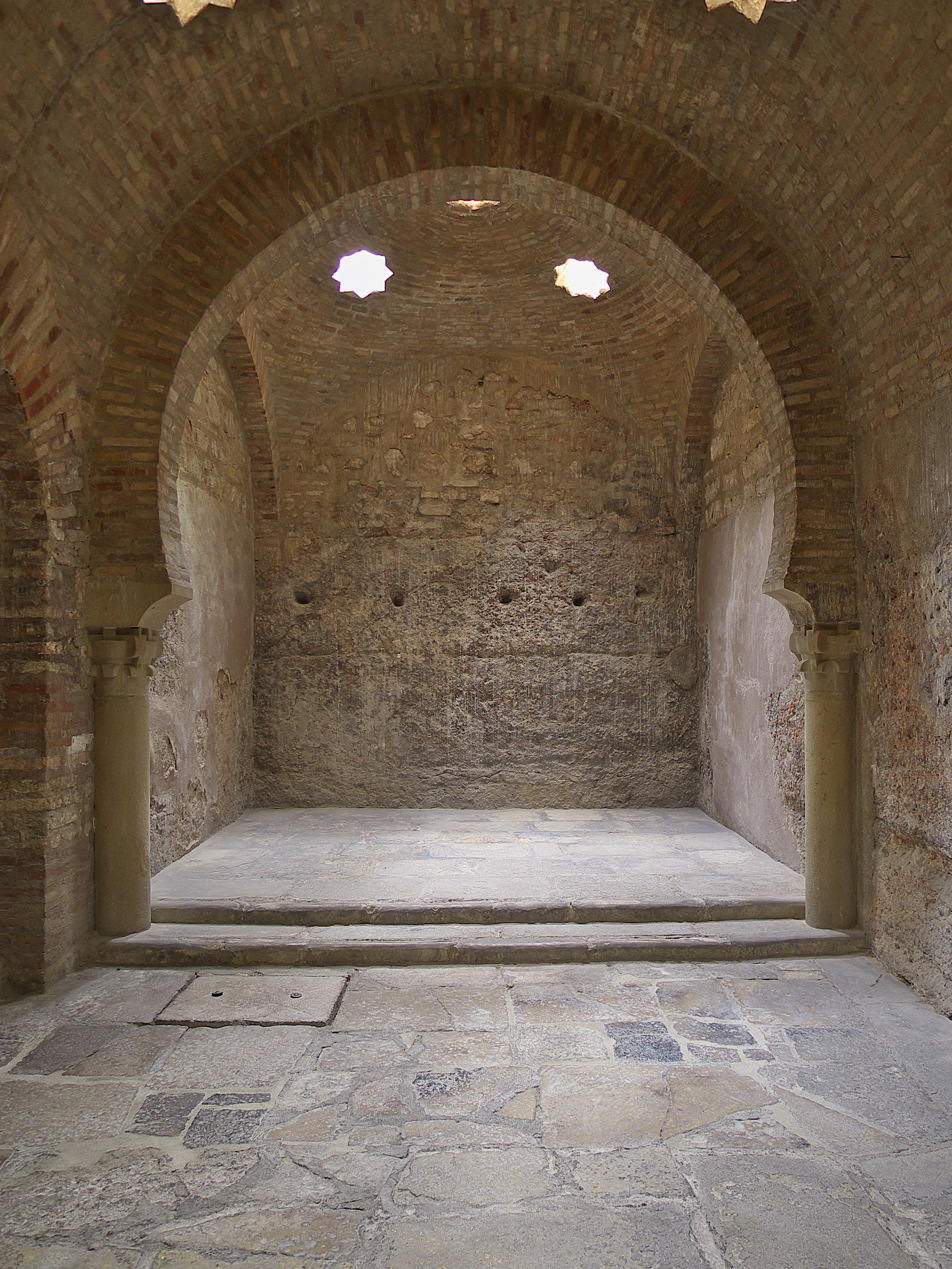
The hot room (bayt al-sajun)

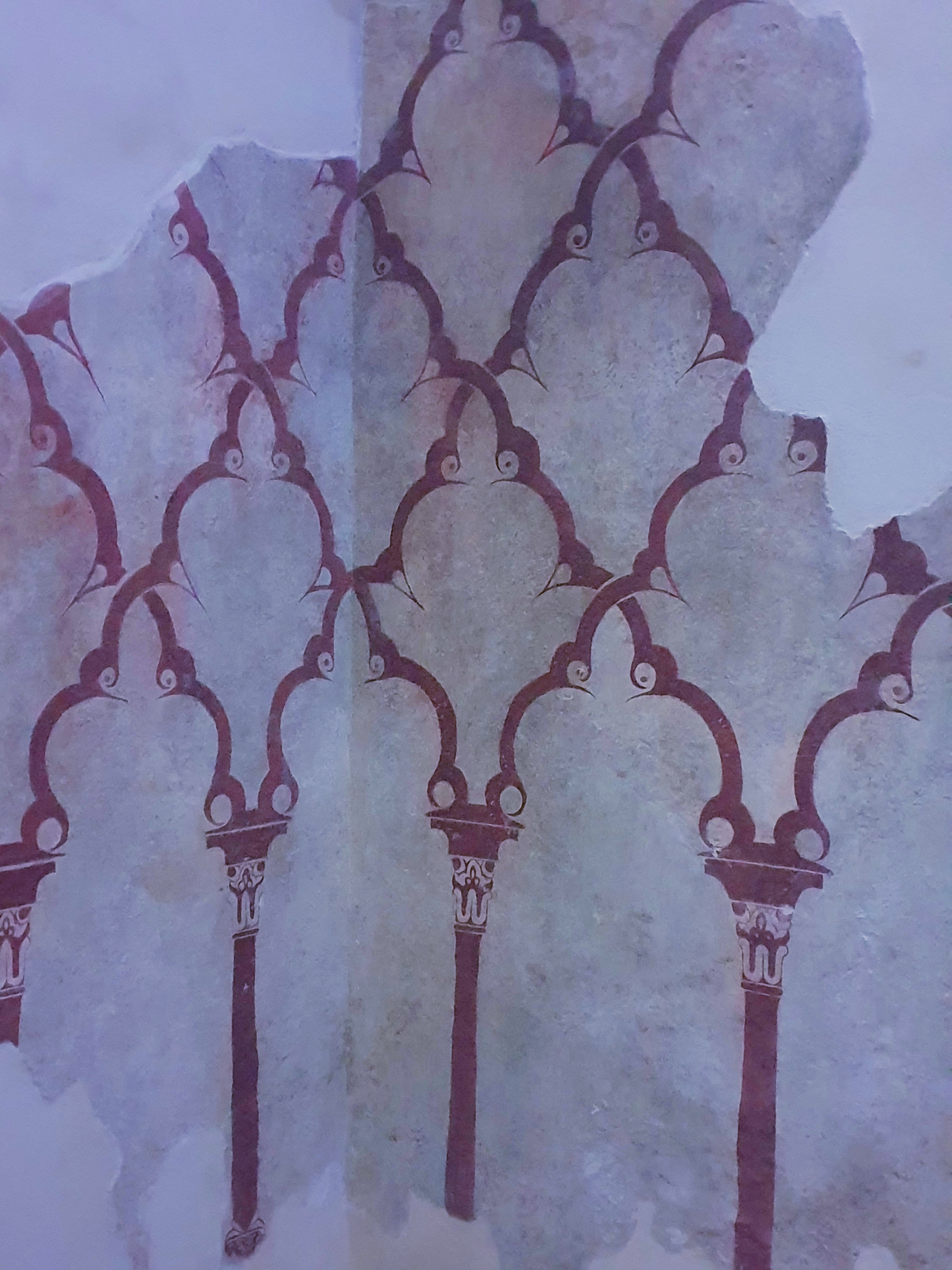
Fresco wall paintings in the vestibule, discovered in 2019

== Tourism ==
Spain's royals visited the baths in 1990.

The baths are open to visitors as a historical attraction, the baños árabes, as part of the Palacio de Villardompardo.

In 2023, they were visited by a total of 92,714 people.

== See also ==
- Caliphal Baths
- El Bañuelo
- Moorish architecture
- ghusl (Islamic ablutions)
