= Siege of Málaga (1487) =

Part of the Reconquista of Spain

- Part of the Granada War
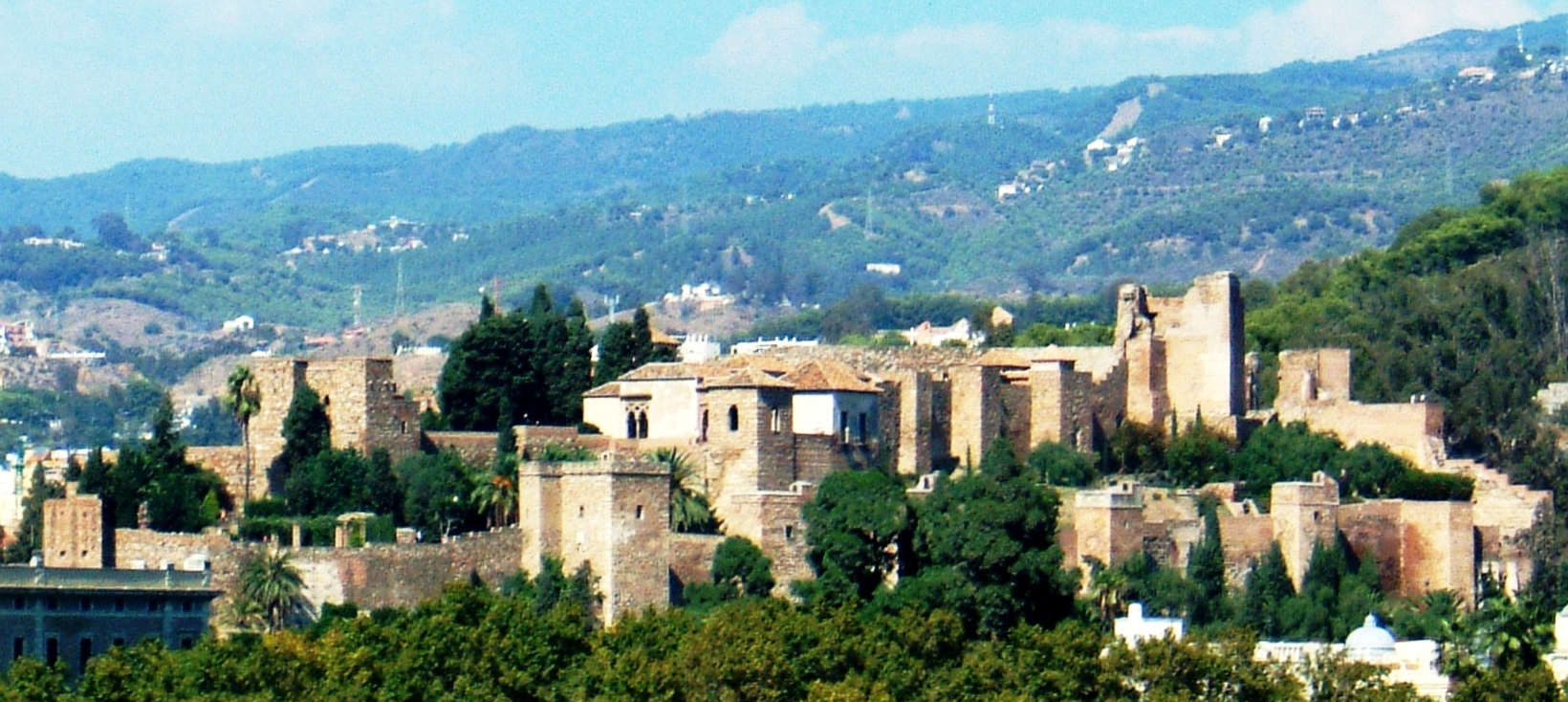
- Alcazaba of Málaga, built by the Hammudid dynasty in the 11th century
Date	7 May 1487 – 18 August 1487
Location	Málaga 36°43′24″N 04°24′42″W
Result	Christian victory
Territorial changes	Conquest of the city by Castile

Belligerents
Emirate of Granada	Crown of Castile; Crown of Aragon

Commanders and leaders
Hamad el Tagrí †	Isabella; Ferdinand
- Location in Spain

The 1487 siege of Málaga was an action during the Reconquest of Spain in which the Catholic Monarchs of Spain conquered the city of Mālaqa from the Emirate of Granada. The siege lasted about four months. It was the first conflict in which ambulances, or dedicated vehicles for the purpose of carrying injured persons, were used. (Note: The ambulances arranged by Queen Isabel of Castile were large bedded wagons that were used to carry wounded soldiers to tent hospitals far from the lines. The care that could be provided was limited, but the attempt at care would have been good for morale.) Geopolitically, the loss of the emirate's second largest city—after Granada itself—and its most important port was a major loss for Granada. Most of the surviving population of the city were enslaved or put to death by the conquerors.

== Background ==
Emirate of Granada in 1462 (dark green), with dates of later conquests

Mālaqa was the main objective of the 1487 campaign by the Catholic Monarchs against the Emirate of Granada, which had been steadily losing territory to the Crown of Castile forces. King Ferdinand II of Aragon left Córdoba with an army of 20,000 horsemen, 50,000 laborers, and 8,000 support troops. This contingent joined the artillery commanded by Francisco Ramírez de Madrid that left Écija. The army decided to first attack Vélez-Málaga, and then continue west to Malaga. Nasrid spies gave word of the movements of the Christians, and the inhabitants of Vélez fled to the mountains of Alpujarras and the Bentomiz Castle.

The Spanish reached Vélez-Málaga on 17 April 1487 after a slow advance through difficult country. A few days later the lighter siege engines arrived. It had proved impossible to move the heavier ones along the poor roads. Muhammad XII of Granada (El Zagal) made an attempt to relieve Vélez, but was forced to retreat to Granada by the superior forces of the marquis of Cádiz. On his arrival there, he found that he had been overthrown in favor of his nephew Abdallah Muhammad XI. Seeing no hope of relief, Vélez capitulated on 27 April 1487 on condition that the lives of the people would be spared, and they would keep their property and religion. Smaller places also surrendered along the road to Málaga, the next objective.

== City of Mālaqa ==
The Moorish city of Mālaqa was the second city in the emirate after Granada itself, a major trading port on the Mediterranean. The city was prosperous, with elegant architecture, gardens, and fountains. The city was surrounded by fortifications, which were in good condition. Above it was the citadel, the Alcazaba of Málaga, connected via a covered way with the impregnable fortress of Gibralfaro. A land-side suburb was also ringed by a strong wall. Towards the sea were orchards of olives, oranges, and pomegranates, and vineyards from whose grapes the sweet fortified Malaga wine, an important export, was made.

The city was well-supplied with artillery and ammunition. In addition to the normal garrison, it contained volunteers from other towns in the regions and a corps of Gomeres, experienced and disciplined African mercenaries. Hamet el Zegrí, the former defender of Ronda, was in command of the defense. (Note: The army had taken the city of Ronda by storm on 22 May 1485. The city's commander (arraez), the Moorish chieftain Hamet el Zegrí (Hamad al-Tagri), had refused Ferdinand and Isabella's offer to accept his vassalage, and had moved to Mālaqa, where he led the Muslim resistance.)

== Siege (7 May – 13 August 1487) ==
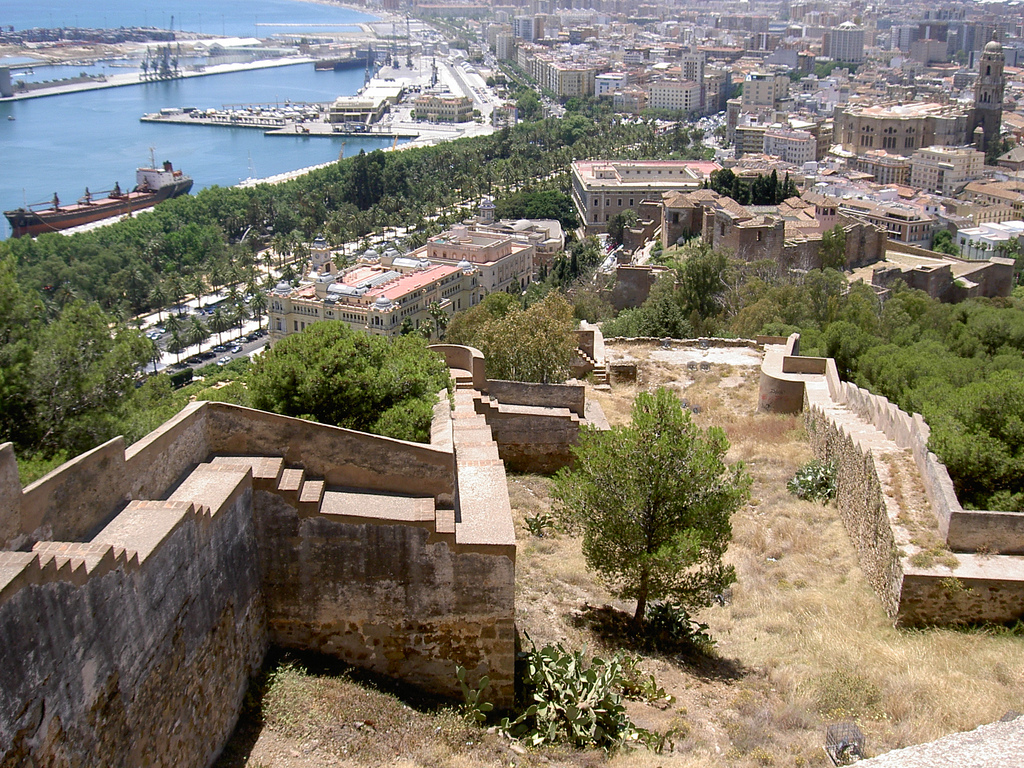
Modern Málaga from the ramparts of Gibralfaro, looking towards the citadel, visible below

While still at Vélez, Ferdinand attempted to negotiate a surrender on good terms, but his offers were refused by Hamet el Zegrí. Ferdinand left Vélez on 7 May 1487 and advanced along the coast to Bezmiliana, about six miles from Mālaqa, where the road led between two heights defended by the Muslims. A fight ensued that continued until evening, when the Christians managed to turn the position and the Nasrid retreated to the Gibralfaro fortress. The landward height was converted into a Christian strong point, and they began construction of works encircling the city. These were either a trench and palisade, or an earth embankment where the ground was too rocky for excavation. A fleet of armed ships, galleys, and caravels placed in the harbor cut off all access to the city from the sea. "

The first attack was against the landward suburb. They breached the wall, and after strong resistance the Muslims were driven back into the city. The Chronicle of the Catholic Monarchs by Don Juan M. Carriazo reveals the aftermath of this battle:

"The Christians had received very great damage at the beginning and more than fifty of them were killed and others wounded. Among them, three principal men were killed: Garci Bravo, governor of Atienza; Diego Lopez de Medrano, his son-in-law; and Gabriel de Sotomayor, brave knights of noble lineage."

King Ferdinand II sent an expedition to the ruins of Algeciras to retrieve stone balls used in the Siege of Algeciras (1342–44) so they could be used against Mālaqa. Queen Isabella joined her husband, accompanied by her court and by various high clergymen and nobles, a move that helped to boost morale.

The Muslims kept up fire from the city on the opposing lines, and made repeated sallies, sometimes in strength. There were also attempts to relieve the city. In one case, El Zagal sent a body of cavalry from Guadix, but a stronger force sent by Abdallah intercepted and defeated it. Abdallah followed up by sending costly gifts to the Catholic monarchs and assuring them of his friendly disposition. In return, the monarchs agreed to leave his subjects in peace and to allow non-military trade between Granada and Spain. Málaga began to run short of food supplies. The Holy Roman Empire sided with Castile and Aragon by Maximilian I sending two Flemish transports with military supplies.

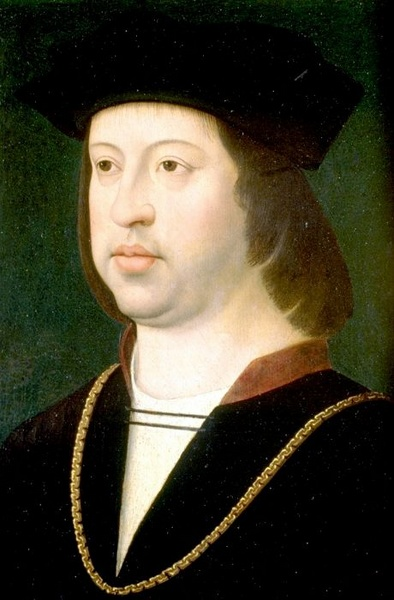
Ferdinand II of Aragon

Ferdinand had intended to starve the city out, but became impatient with the delays and began construction of mobile siege towers that could be used to bridge the walls, and mines to enter the city from below or to undermine the walls. The Muslims attacked and destroyed the towers, counter-mined and drove out the Castilian and Aragonese forces and sent out armed vessels against their fleet.

However, after three months they managed to take possession of an outlying tower attached with a bridge of four arches to the city wall, a key point from which to advance into the city. By this time, the population had run out of stores of food and had been reduced to the extremes of eating dogs and cats, eating the leaves of vines and palms, and chewing hides. Seeing their extreme suffering, Hamet el Zegrí eventually agreed to withdraw with his forces to the Gibralfaro, and let the population make terms with the Christians.

== Capitulation (13–18 August 1487) ==
After unsuccessful attempts to negotiate terms, the representatives of the city eventually capitulated without conditions, throwing themselves on Ferdinand's mercy. The city surrendered on 13 August 1487. The citadel held out until 18 August 1487 when its leader, the merchant Ali Dordux, surrendered on the basis that his group of twenty-five families would be allowed to stay as Mudéjars. The monarchs entered triumphantly on 18 August 1487. The fortress of the Gibralfaro, under the command of Hamet el Zegrí, surrendered the next day.

== Aftermath ==
The conquest of Málaga was a harsh blow to the Nasrid kingdom of Granada, which lost its principal seaport. King Ferdinand II of Aragon had tried to negotiate the surrender of the city several times during the siege, but the defending forces declined it. As a result, the conquerors imposed a harsh penalty to the defeated side: the population was condemned to slavery or death, other than the group led by Ali Dordux. Hamet el Zegrí was executed. The survivors, numbering from 11,000 to 15,000 excluding the foreign mercenaries, were enslaved and their property confiscated. Some were sent to the North of Africa in exchange for captives, some were sold to defray the costs of the campaign, and some were distributed as gifts.

After the conquest, the Jewish population of Málaga was taken prisoner and held in a prison camp in Carmona. About half of the ransom was covered by the captives' own assets, while the remainder was collected with the assistance of emissaries, accompanied by Jews fluent in Castilian to act as translators. Abraham Senior and Meir Melamed served as guarantors for the payment, which was completed only by early June 1489. Queen Isabella later issued a document, known as an horro, allowing those who wished to settle elsewhere in Castile or emigrate to Muslim-controlled North Africa.

The task of reorganizing the territory was given to García Fernández Manrique, who had captured the fortress, and to Juan de la Fuente, two experienced administrators. Manrique made use of the help of Ali Dordux. Land was given in payment to the troops that accompanied the conquistadors. Between 5,000 and 6,000 native settlers from Extremadura, León, Castile, Galicia and the Levant repopulated the province, of whom about a thousand settled in the capital.
