= Gibralfaro =

Mountain in Spain

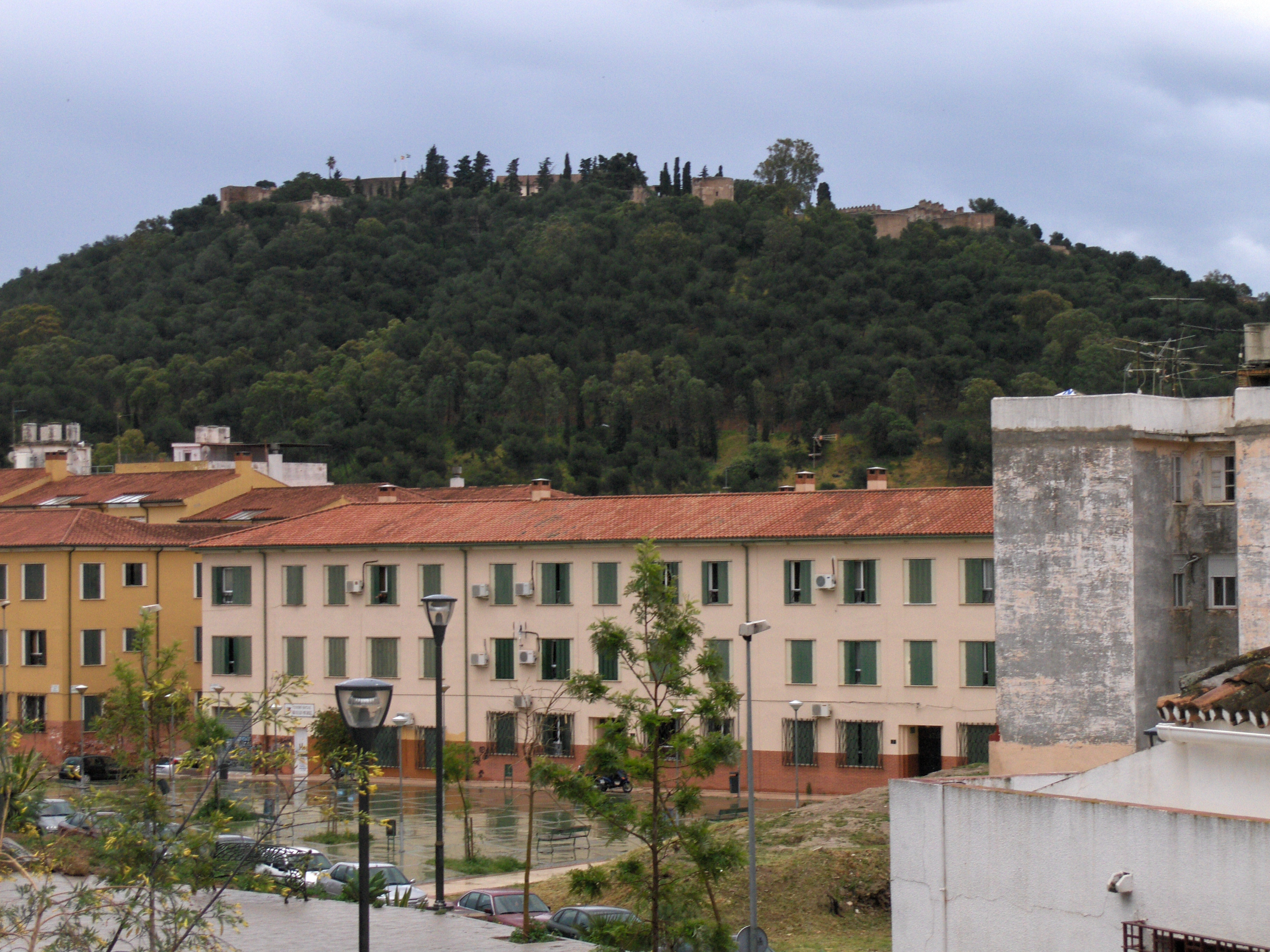
- Mount Gibralfaro with the Castle on top

Highest point
- Elevation: 130 m (430 ft)
- Coordinates: 36°43′24″N 04°24′39″W

Geography
- Location within Spain
- Location: Málaga province, Andalusia
- Parent range: Montes de Málaga

Geology
- Mountain type: Limestone

Climbing
- Easiest route: From Málaga

Mount Gibralfaro (Spanish: Monte Gibralfaro [ˈmonte xiβɾalˈfaɾo]) is a hill located in Málaga in the south of Spain. It is a 130 m high foothill of the Montes de Málaga, part of the Cordillera Penibética.

At the top of the hill stands the Castle of Gibralfaro overlooking Málaga city and the Mediterranean Sea, and connected by a walled corridor to the Alcazaba of Málaga.

== History ==
Gibralfaro has been the site of fortifications since the Phoenician foundation of Málaga city, circa 770 BC. The location was fortified by Caliph Abd-al-Rahman III in 929 CE. At the beginning of the 14th century, Yusuf I of the Kingdom of Granada expanded the fortifications within the Phoenician lighthouse enclosure and erected a double wall to the Alcazaba. The name is said to be derived from Arabic, Jabal (Arabic: جَبَل) the word for mountain, and Greek the word for light, meaning "rock of the lighthouse". In Arabic it is called Jabal Fārū (Arabic: جبل فارو) or Jabal Al-Fārū (Arabic: جبل الفارو). The castle is famous for its three-month siege in 1487 by the Catholic monarchs, King Ferdinand and Queen Isabella, which ended when hunger forced the Moors to surrender.

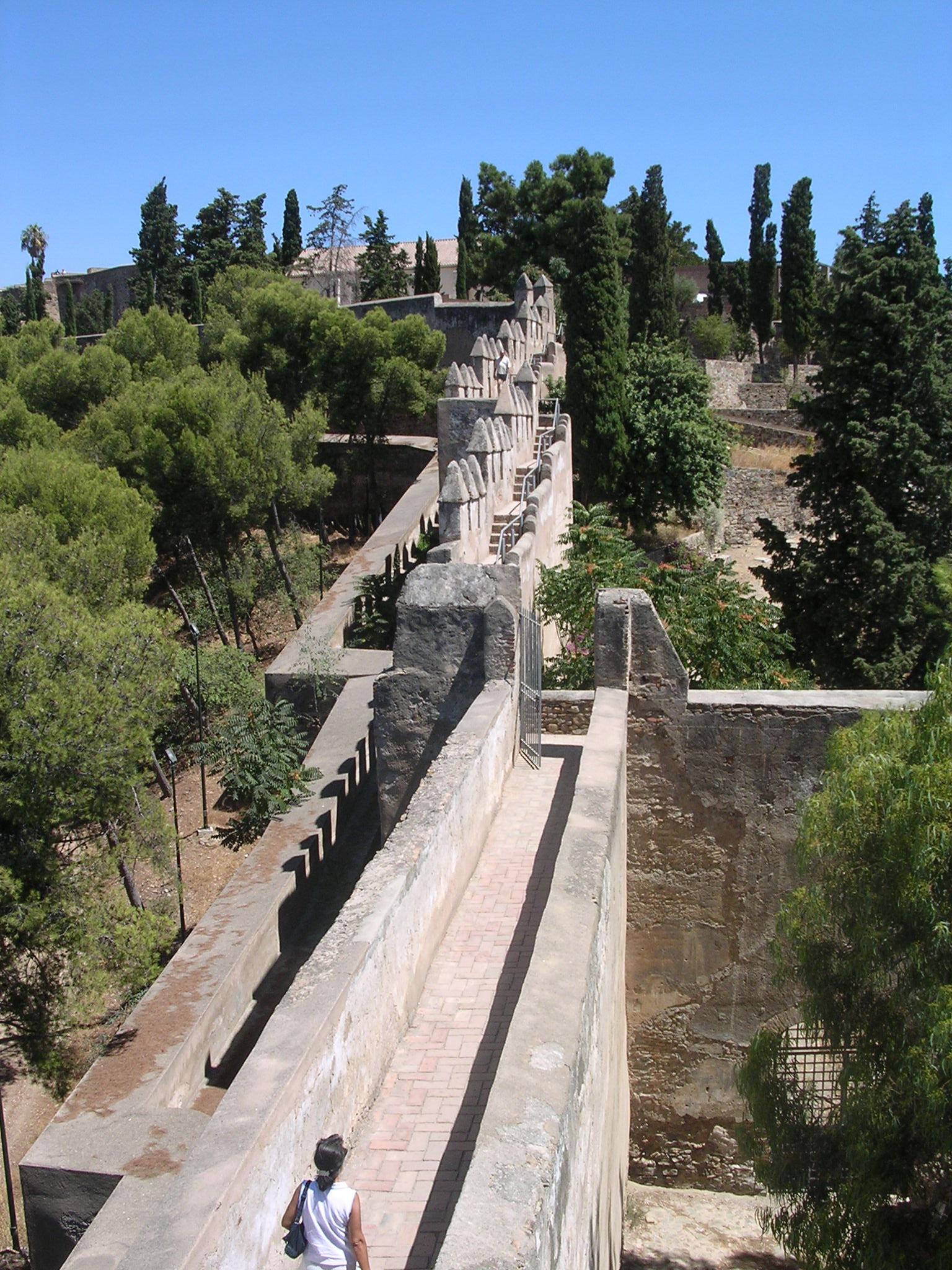
Restored double walled coracha terrestre to Castle of Gibralfaro from Alcazaba

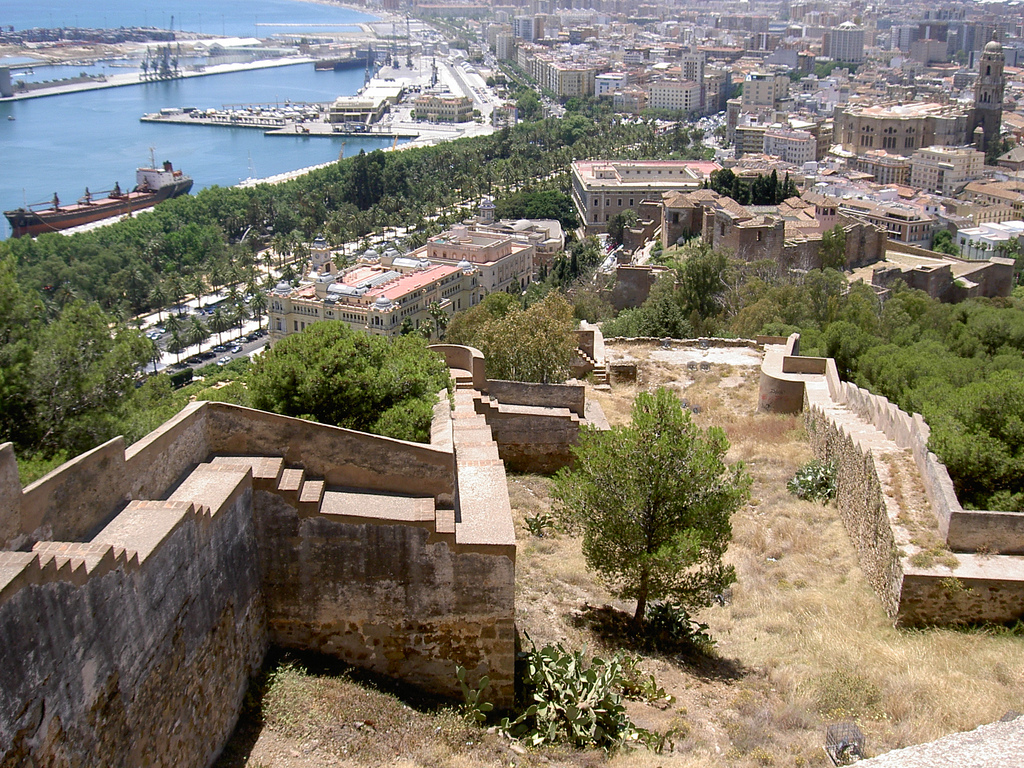
Málaga from the ramparts of Gibralfaro, looking towards the Alcazaba (visible below)

The most visible remains of the Castle today are the solid ramparts rising above the pines In the Centro de Interpretación de Gibralfaro (Gibralfaro Interpretation Center) in the former gunpowder arsenal of the Castle is a little museum that shows the castle's history over the centuries since the Reconquest. The castle was used as a military base until 1925.

At the end of 2005, a thick forest of pines and eucalyptus trees were planted on the hill. On its outskirts are the historical buildings of the seminary and the Alcazaba, the Jardines de Puerta Oscura (Dark Gate Gardens), as well as a Parador.

Currently pending approval is a project intended to safeguard the mount and its surroundings from any urban intervention and promote it as a space for public recreation. Another project is planned to build a cable car linking the city center with the Gibralfaro castle.

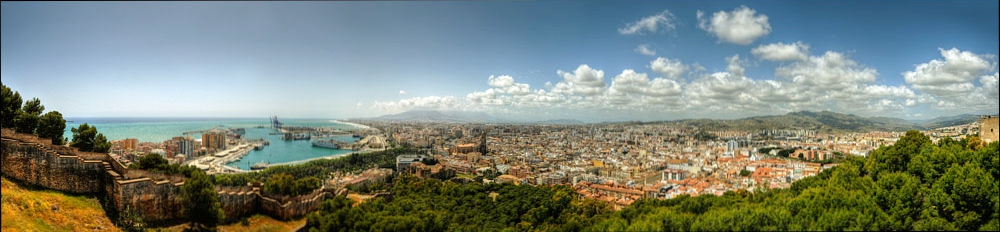
Panoramic Málaga from Gibralfaro

== Geology ==
Gibralfaro is part of the southern foothills of the Montes de Málaga, a mountain range of the Cordillera Penibética, formed of materials from the Maláguide complex of the Baetic Cordillera.
