= Leopoldo Torres Balbás =

Leopoldo Torres Balbás (23 May 1888, in Madrid – 21 November 1960, in Madrid) was a Spanish scholar, architect, and restorer. He was an important figure in the early 20th century conservation and restoration of monuments. Much of his work focused on the historical heritage of al-Andalus (Islamic-era Spain) of Granada, Spain. In 1923 he was appointed curator and chief architect in charge of the Alhambra, where his restoration work was crucial to its modern preservation. He was dismissed from his post in 1936 after the start of the Spanish Civil War. He devoted the rest of his life to teaching and research.
