= Lalla Masuda =

Moroccan political figure

Mas'uda al-Wizkitiya مسعودة الوزكيتية
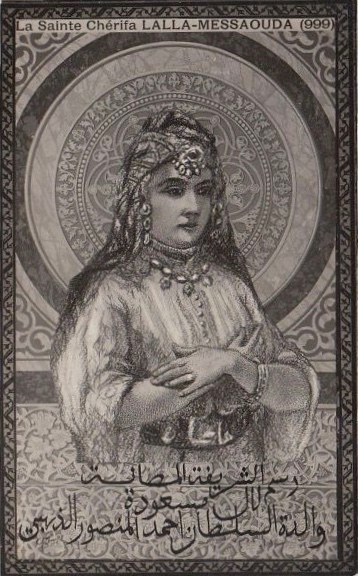
- Depiction of Lalla Masuda from the 16th century
- Died: 1591
- Burial: Saadian Tombs
- Spouse: Mohammed al-Shaykh
- Issue: Ahmad al-Mansur
- House: Saadi dynasty (by marriage)
- Father: Sheikh Abu al-'Abaas Ahmed bin Abdellah al-Wizkiti
- Religion: Islam

Mas'uda al-Wizkitiya (Arabic: مسعودة الوزكيتية; died 1591), known popularly in Morocco as Lala 'Auda (للا عودة) and in Western sources as Lalla Masuda, was a Moroccan political figure in the Saadi Dynasty. She is remembered for her humanitarian, charity, political, and development work. She was the wife of the Saadian Sultan Mohammed al-Shaykh and mother of their son Sultan Ahmad al-Mansur.

Lalla Masuda was the daughter of the sheikh of the qasba of Warzazat, Sheikh Abu al-'Abaas Ahmed bin Abdellah al-Wizkiti al-Warzazi, who had a hand in establishing Saadian control over the Sous-Dra'a region. She is considered a waliya, or saint.

== Name ==
Mas'uda al-Wizkitiya is popularly remembered as Lala 'Auda (للا عودة), meaning the Lady of Return, as she would often travel through remote areas in the countryside bringing auspice and fortune. She has also been called as-Sayida al-Hurra (السيدة الحرة, the Free Lady) and the Phoenix of the Sahara (عنقاء الصحراء).

== Biography ==
Lalla Mas’uda is from the Ait Ouaouzguit tribe, who are Chleuhs of the Masmuda confederation. Timbuktu historian ‘Abd ar-Rahman as-Sa‘di argued instead she was a Fulani concubine. She established mosques and Quranic schools, including the Bab Doukkala Mosque. The Lala 'Auda Mosque in Meknes, also carries her name, as does the adjacent Lalla 'Auda Square.

She also set out to improve roads within the kingdom, particularly in rural areas to connect them with urban centers to give them access to essential services, such as healthcare and education. She is credited with building the bridge over the Um ar-Rabii'a River.

She also provided administrative counsel to her son Ahmad al-Mansur. She recommended, for example, that he seek help from the Ottoman sultan, Selim II.

She supported impoverished communities in rural areas through economic assistance and support for small businesses. She also facilitated the marriage of young people to strengthen those communities. She helped these young people exercise the right to marriage and family life by helping them secure dowries, marriage costs, and other financial burdens preventing them from getting married.

She seemed to have a noted inclination for documentation, meticulously documenting her activities and charitable donations.

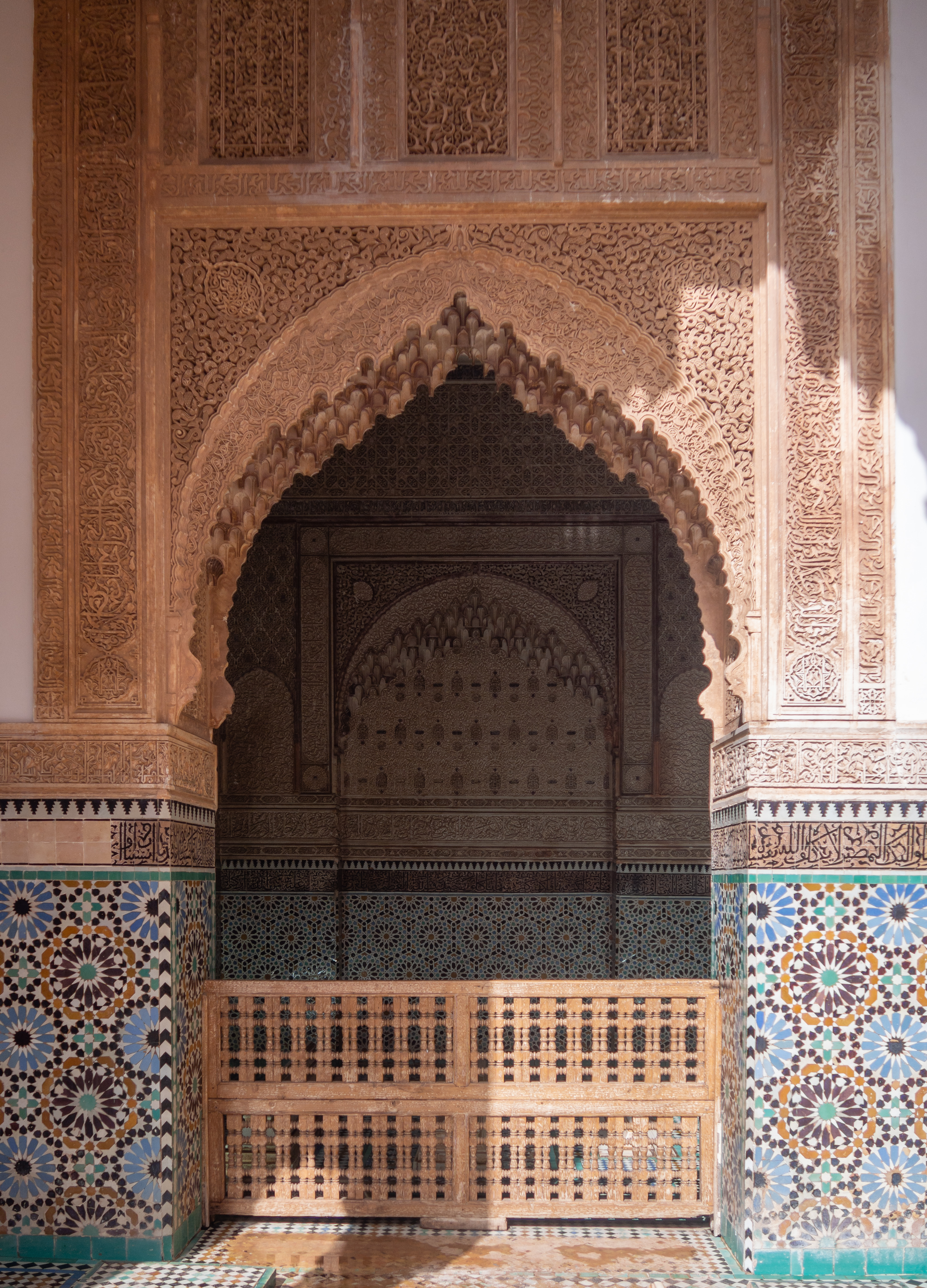
The chamber of Lalla Masuda at the Saadian Tombs in Marrakesh.

The Lalla Masuda Qubba is the oldest part of the Saadian Tombs in Marrakesh.

The Marrakshi historian Al-Abbas bin Ibrahim as-Samlali recorded in his encyclopedia Information About the Notables of Marrakesh and Aghmat:

فكم جهزت من يتامى
وكم زوجت من أيامى
وكم بذلت من صدقات
وكم أجزلت من صلات
"For so many orphans did she aid,
and so many widows did she remarry,
and so much charity did she give,
and so generously did she connect."

— Al-Abbas bin Ibrahim as-Samlali, Information about the Notables of Marrakesh and Aghmat
