= Saadian Tombs =

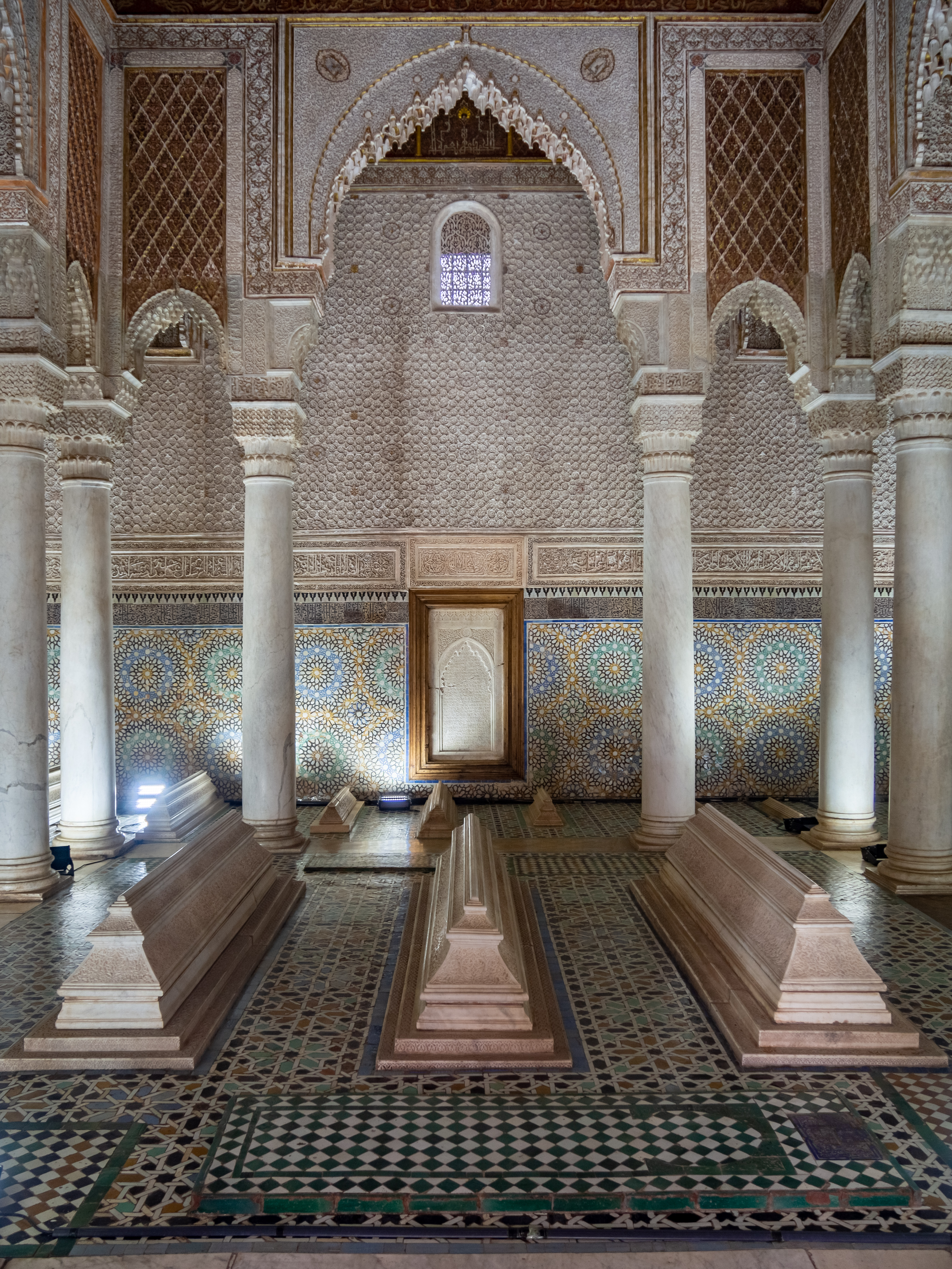
- The Chamber of the Twelve Columns, the mausoleum of Sultan Ahmad al-Mansur
- Interactive map of Saadian Tombs
- 31.6173°N 7.988702°W
- Type: necropolis, cemetery
- Location: Marrakesh, Morocco

History
- Built: late 16th century

Site notes
- Architectural style: Moorish (Moroccan)
- Restored: after 1917
- Current use: historic site & tourist attraction

The Saadian Tombs (Note: In Arabic: قبر السعديين, romanized: qubur as-sa'adiyyin; Berber languages: ⵔⵇⴱⴰⵔ ⵏ ⵉⵙⴰⵄⴰⴷⵉⵢⵏ) are a historic royal necropolis in Marrakesh, Morocco, located on the south side of the Kasbah Mosque, inside the royal kasbah (citadel) district of the city. They date to the time of the Saadian dynasty and in particular to the reign of Ahmad al-Mansur (1578–1603), though members of Morocco's monarchy continued to be buried here for a time afterwards. The complex is regarded by many art historians as the high point of Moroccan architecture in the Saadian period due to its luxurious decoration and careful interior design. Today the site is a major tourist attraction in Marrakesh.

== Name ==
The necropolis is commonly known as the Saadian Tombs today. In historical Arabic texts, they were referred to as the "qubbas of the sharifs" or "tombs of the sharifs" (Arabic: قبر أشراف, romanized: qubur al-ashrāf).

== History ==
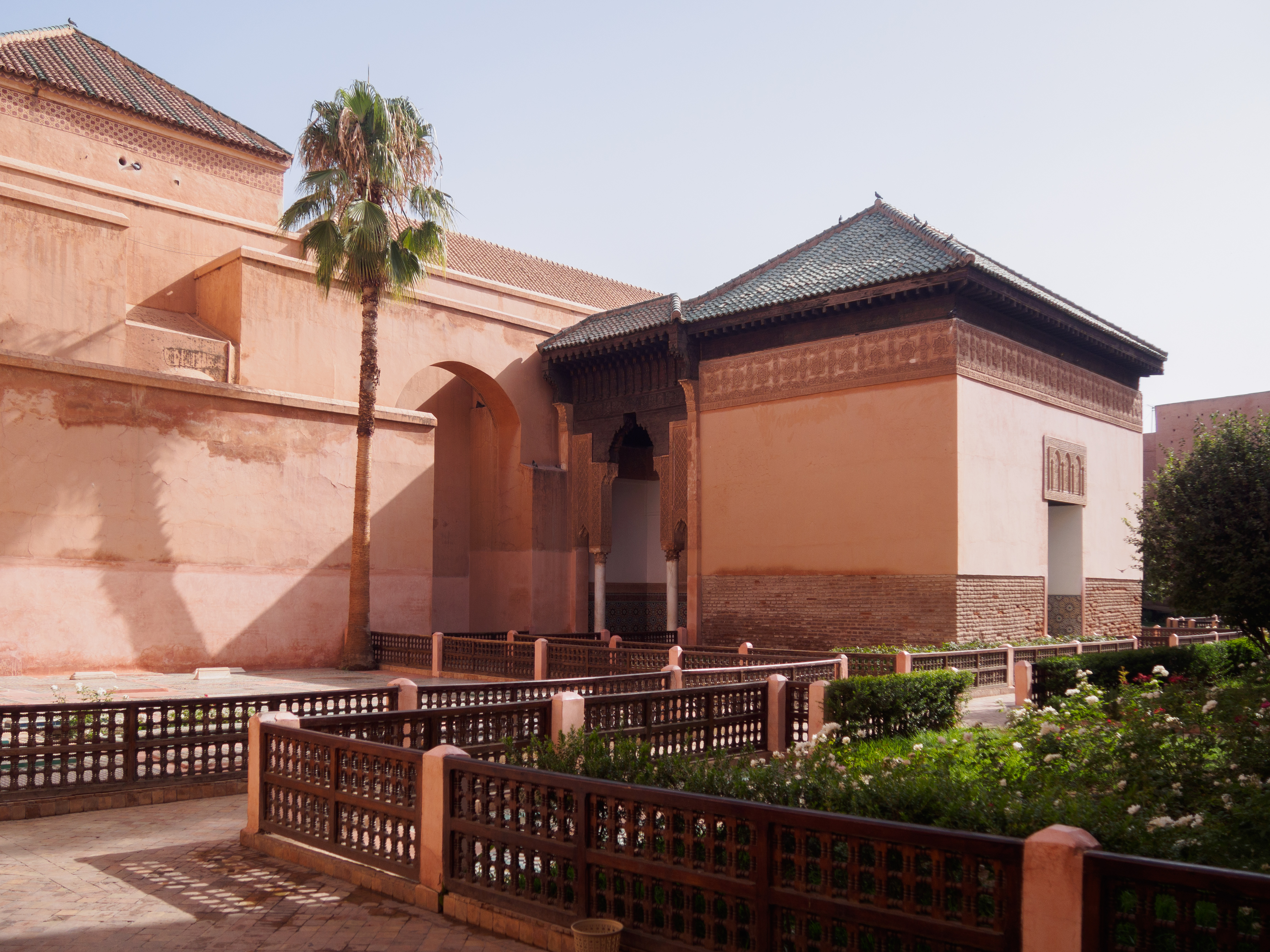
View of the older eastern mausoleum (right), built up against the outer walls of the Kasbah Mosque

=== Before the Saadians ===
The early history of the necropolis is not well known. The necropolis is located right behind the qibla wall (in this case the southeastern wall) of the Kasbah Mosque, which was built, along with the surrounding royal kasbah (citadel), by the Almohad ruler Abu Yusuf Ya'qub al-Mansur in the late 12th century. Accordingly, it is believed that this was the site of a necropolis even in Almohad times, though there's no evidence of any significant figures being buried here at that time (the Almohad rulers were buried at Tinmal instead).

It is known, however, that in the 14th century, during the Marinid dynasty period, Sultan Abu al-Hasan was buried here temporarily in 1351. He died while in exile in the High Atlas mountains and Marrakesh was thus the closest city for burial (which, under Islamic tradition, must be carried out quickly). A few months later his body was then moved and reburied in the Marinid royal necropolis at Chellah (near Rabat). A marble tombstone with a long inscription attests to his first burial in the Marrakesh kasbah necropolis, and this tombstone is still found in the Chamber of the Three Niches in the Saadian tombs today (presumably moved there during or after Saadian construction). The Marinid sultan's burial here suggests that it must have already been a cemetery at the time. Afterwards, the necropolis also became the burial site of the Hintati emirs who controlled the region of Marrakesh from the mid-15th century until the 1520s. Some of their epitaphs are still visible today.

=== The Saadian necropolis ===
The present necropolis dates generally from the Saadian period but there are still some questions about the chronology and attribution of the various constructions which have not been resolved beyond doubt. The most generally cited timeline and the most complete analysis was laid out by Deverdun in 1959, based on a number of arguments and lines of evidence.

==== Beginnings under Abdallah al-Ghalib ====
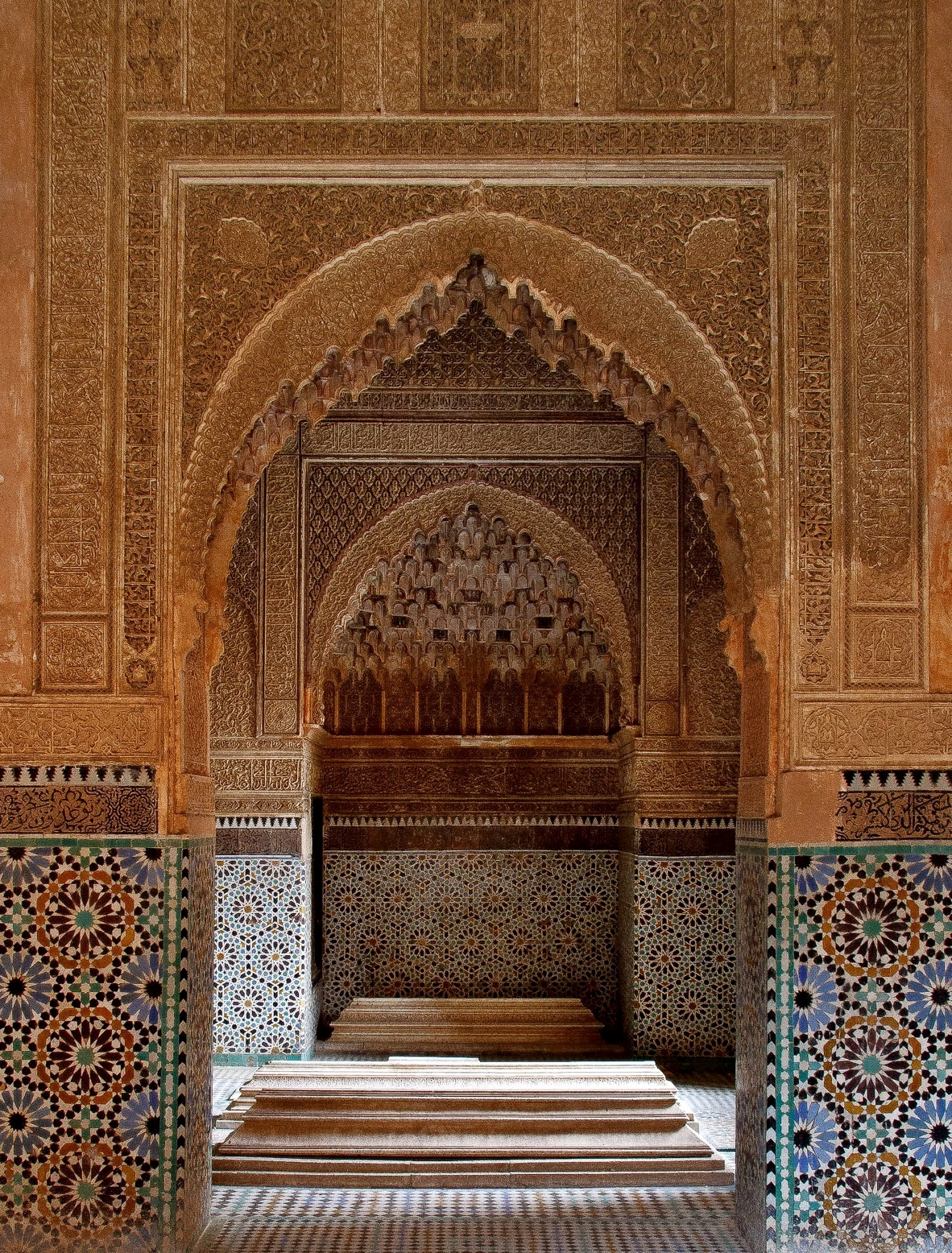
View through an archway towards the tombs of Muhammad al-Shaykh and Lalla Mas'uda

The necropolis has two major structures: one to the east, surrounded by gardens on either side, and one to the west, next to the visitor entrance today. The eastern mausoleum was the first to be built, starting out as a simple square chamber adjoining the southern wall of the Kasbah Mosque. It is believed that this first mausoleum was built by the second Saadian sultan of Marrakesh, Moulay Abdallah al-Ghalib, between 1557 and 1574. Al-Ghalib was already a prolific builder throughout his reign and it seems he wished to erect a mausoleum to honor his father Muhammad al-Shaykh, the founder of the dynasty, who was killed in 1557 and buried here in what was probably a simple grave. Before Muhammad al-Shaykh some Saadians – most notably al-Qai'm, the dynasty's founder, and Ahmad al-Araj and his sons – had been buried in the Zawiya of al-Jazuli and its adjoining cemetery in the city.

Al-Ghalib himself was eventually buried next to his father in 1574, in the new mausoleum he had built. A dedicatory marble inscription panel was placed on the wall at the head of his tomb, but this panel was later moved (at an unknown date and for unknown reasons) to the Chamber of the Three Niches in the later western building. It is probable (but unconfirmed) that the fourth Saadian sultan, Abd al-Malik, was also buried next to Muhammad al-Shaykh (also his father), on the south side of the latter's tomb, in 1578 or after.

==== Expansion under Ahmad al-Mansur ====
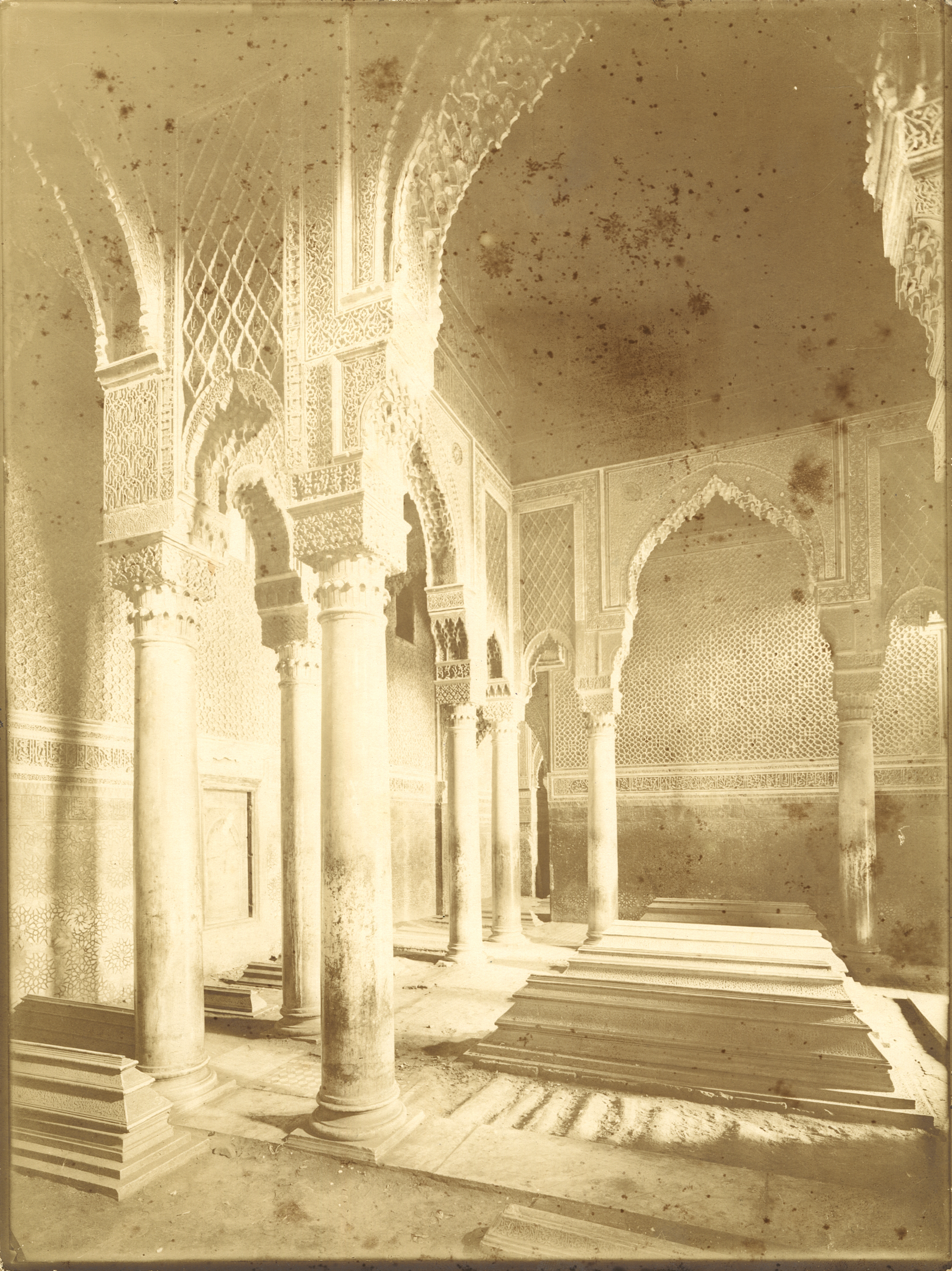
The Chamber of the Twelve Columns in 1927

The next building phase took place during the reign of Ahmad al-Mansur, another of Muhammad al-Shaykh's sons and the most powerful and wealthy of the Saadian sultans, between 1578 and 1603. When al-Mansur's mother, Lalla Mas'uda, a wife of Muhammad al-Shaykh, died in 1591, he decided to have her buried within the same mausoleum chamber as that of his father. It was most likely on this occasion, or slightly after, that al-Mansur decided to modify and expand this mausoleum. He allegedly redid the decoration of the existing chamber, and added two rectangular loggia rooms on its eastern and western sides. He also created a much larger rectangular chamber (the so-called Grand Chamber) on the southern side, connected directly to the other three rooms. It's possible that al-Mansur intended this larger chamber to house his own tomb. At some point, he probably also commissioned two more dedicatory marble inscription panels to be placed at the heads of the tombs of his father (Muhammad al-Shaykh ) and his mother (Lalla Mas'uda). Again for unknown reasons and at an uncertain date, Muhammad al-Shaykh's dedicatory panel was moved to the western building and placed on the back wall of the Chamber of the Twelve Columns, where it is still visible today. The panel dedicated to Lalla Mas'uda has remained next to her grave (although it may have been moved around too).

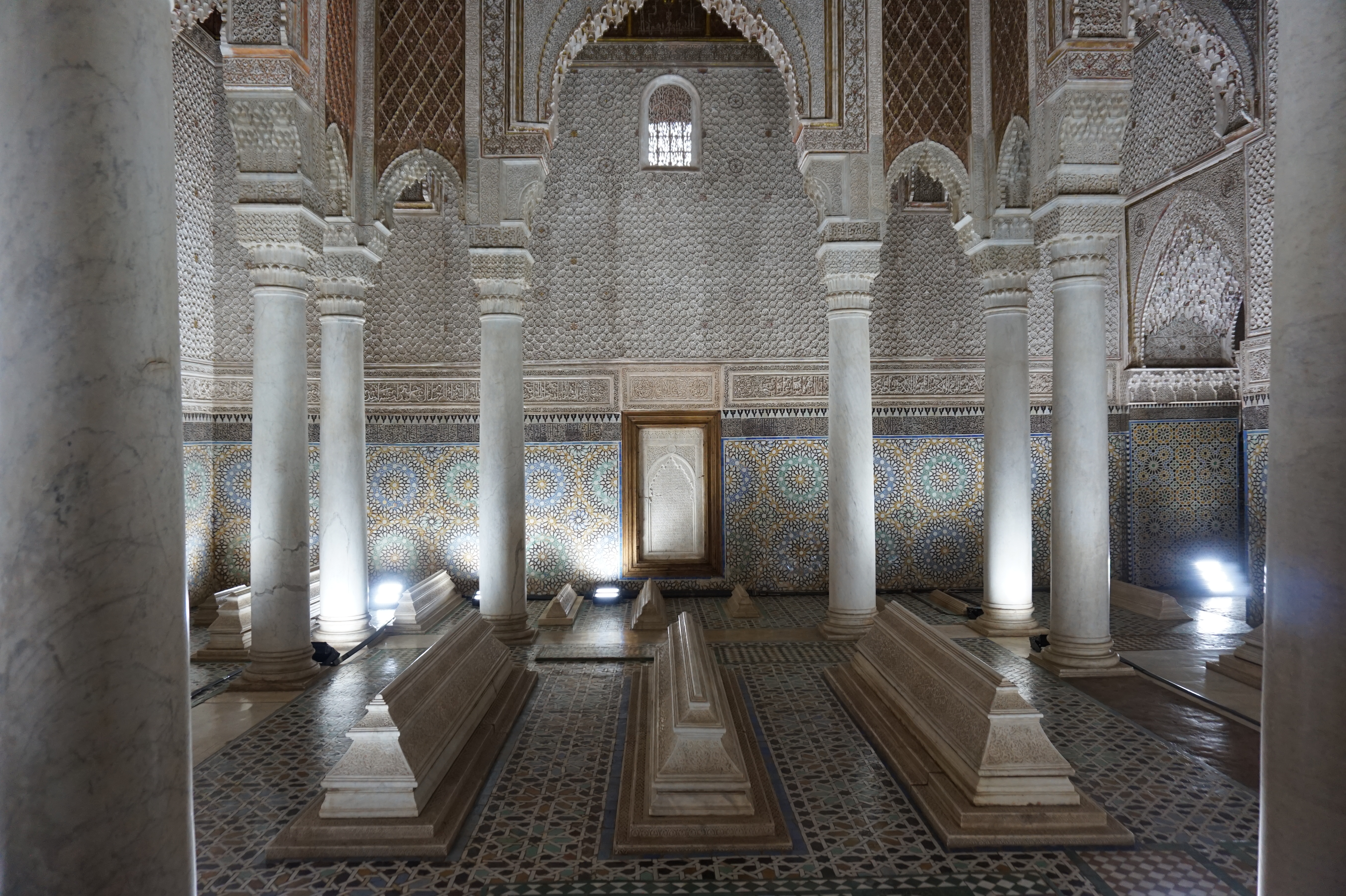
The Chamber of the Twelve Columns. Of the three large tombstones in the center, the one in the middle belongs to Ahmad al-Mansur, the one on the right belongs to Sultan Moulay Zidan, and the one on the left belongs to Sultan Muhammad al-Sheikh al-Saghir.

At some point during al-Mansur's expansion and embellishment of the eastern mausoleum, between 1591 and 1598 (or before 1603 at latest), he decided to abandon this work and embarked on the construction of an entirely new building to the west. This new mausoleum was clearly intended for his own burial. The building was divided into three chambers, from south to north: the Chamber of the Mihrab (a prayer room, not originally meant to house any tombs), the Chamber of the Twelve Columns (a regal tomb chamber for himself), and the Chamber of the Three Niches (an annex to the main chamber). The first person to be buried in this building was probably one of al-Mansur's wives, Mahalla bint Omar al-Marin, in 1598, in a spot close to the eventual tomb of her husband in the Chamber of the Twelve Columns. Ahmad al-Mansur himself was buried in the center of this chamber upon his death in 1603. Some of the decoration in the Chamber of the Mihrab may have been left unfinished after his death. After al-Mansur, a number of other family members, including his successors, were buried in this chamber with him. Among the more important ones, the first was another of his wives, Lalla Aisha as-Shabaniyya, in 1623. Then it was their son, Sultan Moulay Zidan, in 1627, followed by Sultan Abd al-Malik II in 1631 and Sultan Muhammad al-Shaykh al-Saghir in 1653–54. Today, Moulay Zidan's epitaph is immediately to the right of his father's while to the left is Muhammad al-Shaykh al-Saghir. The ornate tombstones (of a type called mqabriya) over these five important royal family members (i.e. al-Mansur, Lalla Aisha as-Shabaniyya, Zidan, Abd al-Malik II, and al-Shaykh al-Saghir) are also the largest and finest in the mausoleum, carved in Carrara marble. Their strong similarity in style and craftsmanship has been argued as evidence that they were created by the same artisan or workshop of artisans between 1603 and 1655, with the mqabriyas of the first two (al-Mansur and Lalla Aisha as-Shabaniyya) probably being commissioned by their son Moulay Zidan and then serving as models for the other three tombstones made later. A number of other lesser royal family members are scattered around the chamber.

=== After the Saadians ===
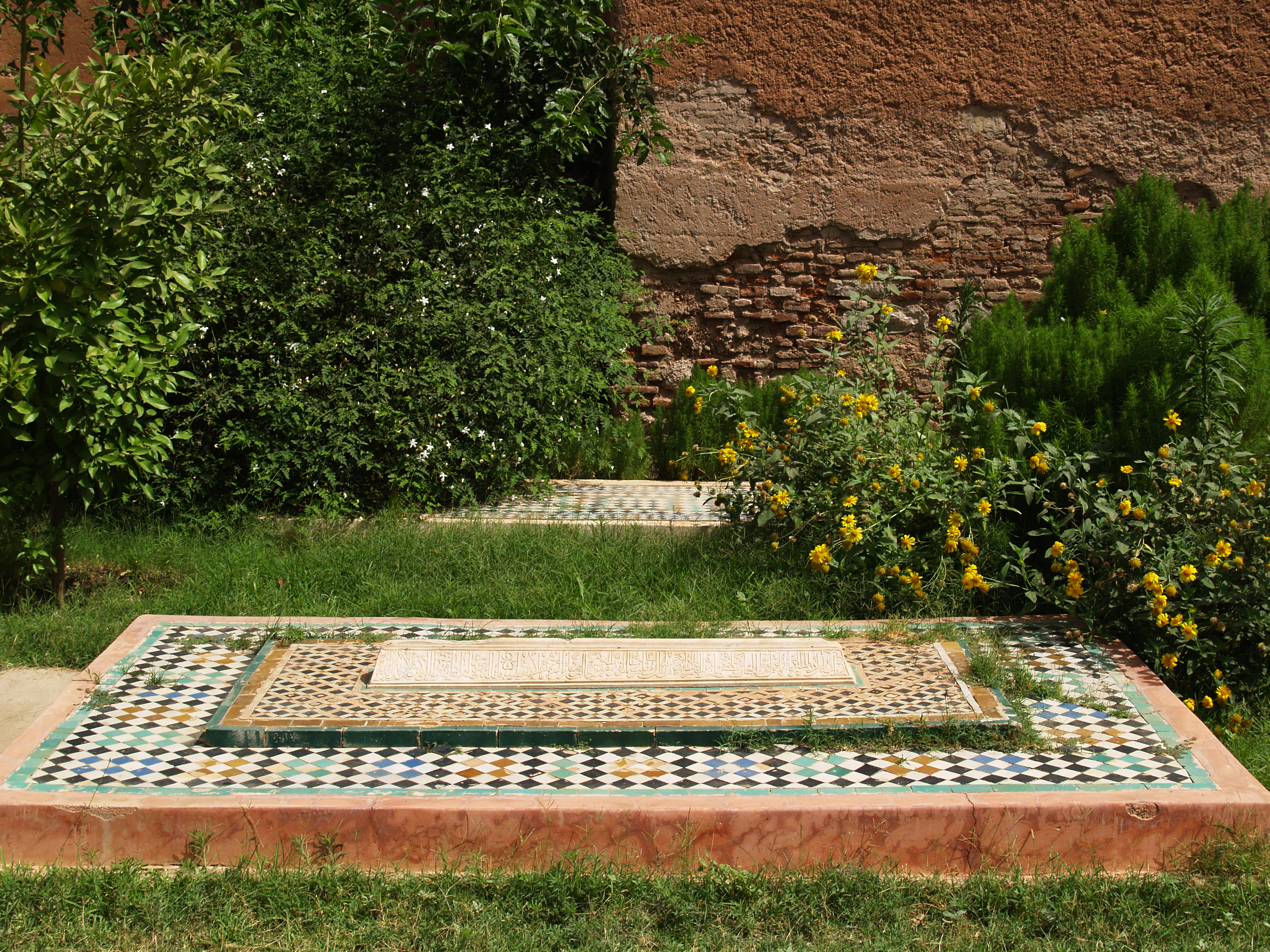
A typical tombstone in the gardens of the necropolis

The necropolis continued to be used as a burial place for some time after al-Mansur's death. The 'Alawi sultan Moulay Isma'il (ruled 1672–1727), who plundered the Saadian palaces, later restricted access to the Saadian necropolis by sealing it off from most of the surrounding buildings. Nonetheless, it continued to be used even in the 'Alawi period, as evidenced by the profusion of graves and tombstones scattered around the cemetery today. The large rectangular chamber (or Grand Chamber) on the southern side of Muhammad al-Shaykh's and Lalla Mas'uda's mausoleum was filled with other tombs. The Chamber of the Mihrab, the southern chamber of Ahmad al-Mansur's construction which was intended to be used merely as a prayer room, was used as a mausoleum by the 'Alawi dynasty up until at least the late 18th century. It is now filled entirely with the graves of 'Alawi family members. One of these graves is reputedly that of the 'Alawi sultan Moulay al-Yazid (died 1792), which was previously marked off by a wooden balustrade and which was sometimes visited by local pilgrims. Moulay al-Yazid's name is now also associated with the Kasbah Mosque and with the square in front of it. In total, the necropolis now contains 56 tombstones marked with mqabriyas (ornate marble epitaphs) and another hundred or so tombs marked simply with multicolored tiles.

=== Modern times ===
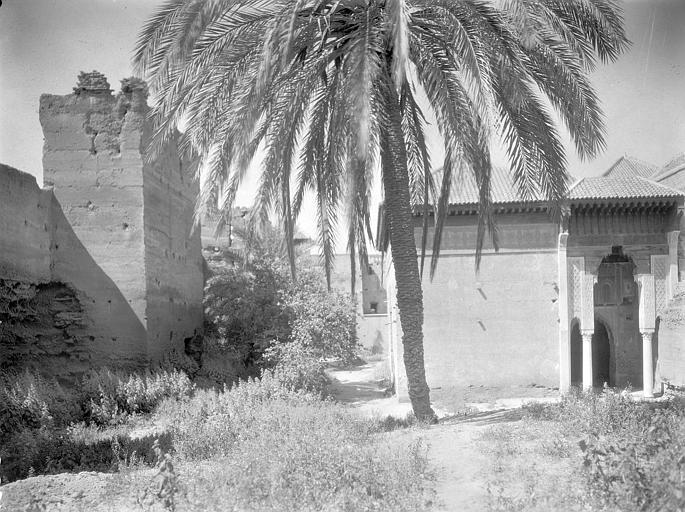
View of the Saadians Tombs circa 1925

Eventually, the necropolis was isolated from the surrounding streets and fell out of use. In 1917 they were "rediscovered" by the Service des Beaux-Arts, Antiquités et Monuments historiques ("Service of Fine Arts, Antiquities, and Historic Monuments") of Morocco, an official body created in 1912 with the beginning of the French Protectorate over Morocco. By then, the tombs were in state of severe disrepair, and from 1917 onward the Service carried out a careful restoration process. Missing parts of the decoration were restored by using surviving parts as a model. The work also opened up the site to the general public for the first time. From the 1920s onward the tombs became the object of study by scholars. Today, they have become a major tourist attraction in Marrakesh.

During the September 2023 earthquake that struck southern Morocco, the tombs suffered damage. The most serious damage was found in the structures that adjoined the site and the Kasbah Mosque, rather than in the tombs themselves. An early assessment found significant cracks in the walls and towers surrounding the enclosure, partial collapses around the site's entrance, some damage to the roof tiles of the eastern mausoleum (of Lalla Mas'uda), and damage to the stucco decoration of the western mausoleum (the Chamber of the Mihrab and the Chamber of Twelve Columns). The site was subsequently closed for repairs and was reopened to visitors in October 2023.

== Architecture and layout ==
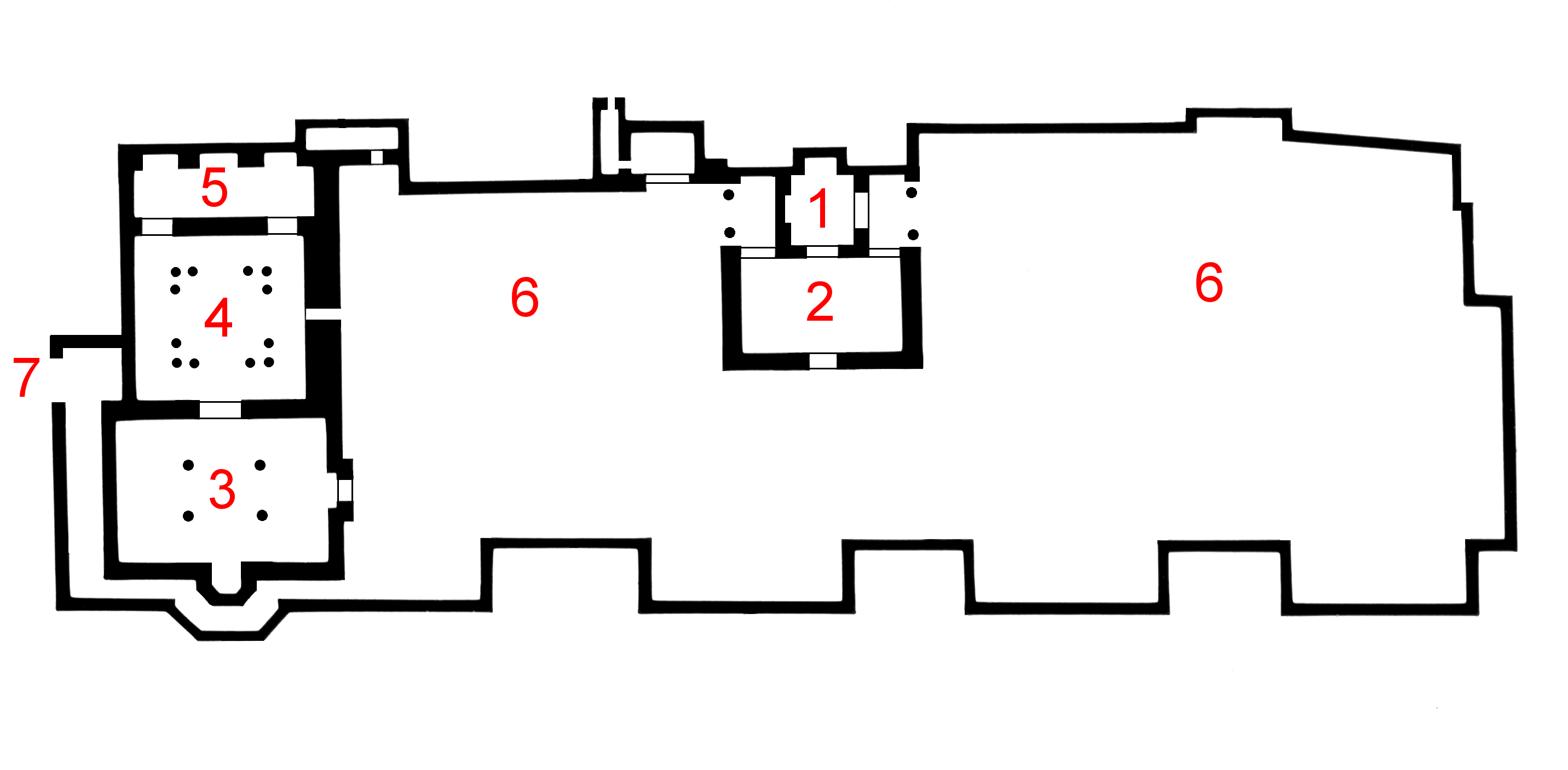
General layout of the Saadian Tombs today. The eastern building is the older mausoleum, consisting of a central square chamber, the Chamber of Lalla Mas'uda (1), and a larger rectangular tomb chamber, the so-called Grand Chamber (2). Two loggias are located on either side of it. The larger western building (on the left) is composed of the Chamber of the Mihrab (3), the Chamber of the Twelve Columns (4), and the Chamber of the Three Niches (5). In between these buildings are gardens full of other tombs (6). Visitors today enter via a narrow passage from the west (7).

The necropolis is a large garden cemetery enclosed by a rampart to the south and by the wall of the Kasbah Mosque to the north. Inside this are two main buildings: one on the western edge of the cemetery (on the left as visitors enter) and the other further east, surrounded by the cemetery gardens. The gardens are filled with graves covered by colourful tiles.

The mausoleums are constructed in the Moorish or western Islamic style that developed in this region over the previous centuries. The decorative techniques seen in the buildings of the preceding Marinid and Nasrid dynasties – who ruled in Morocco and al-Andalus (southern Spain), respectively – are repeated here.

=== The eastern mausoleum ===
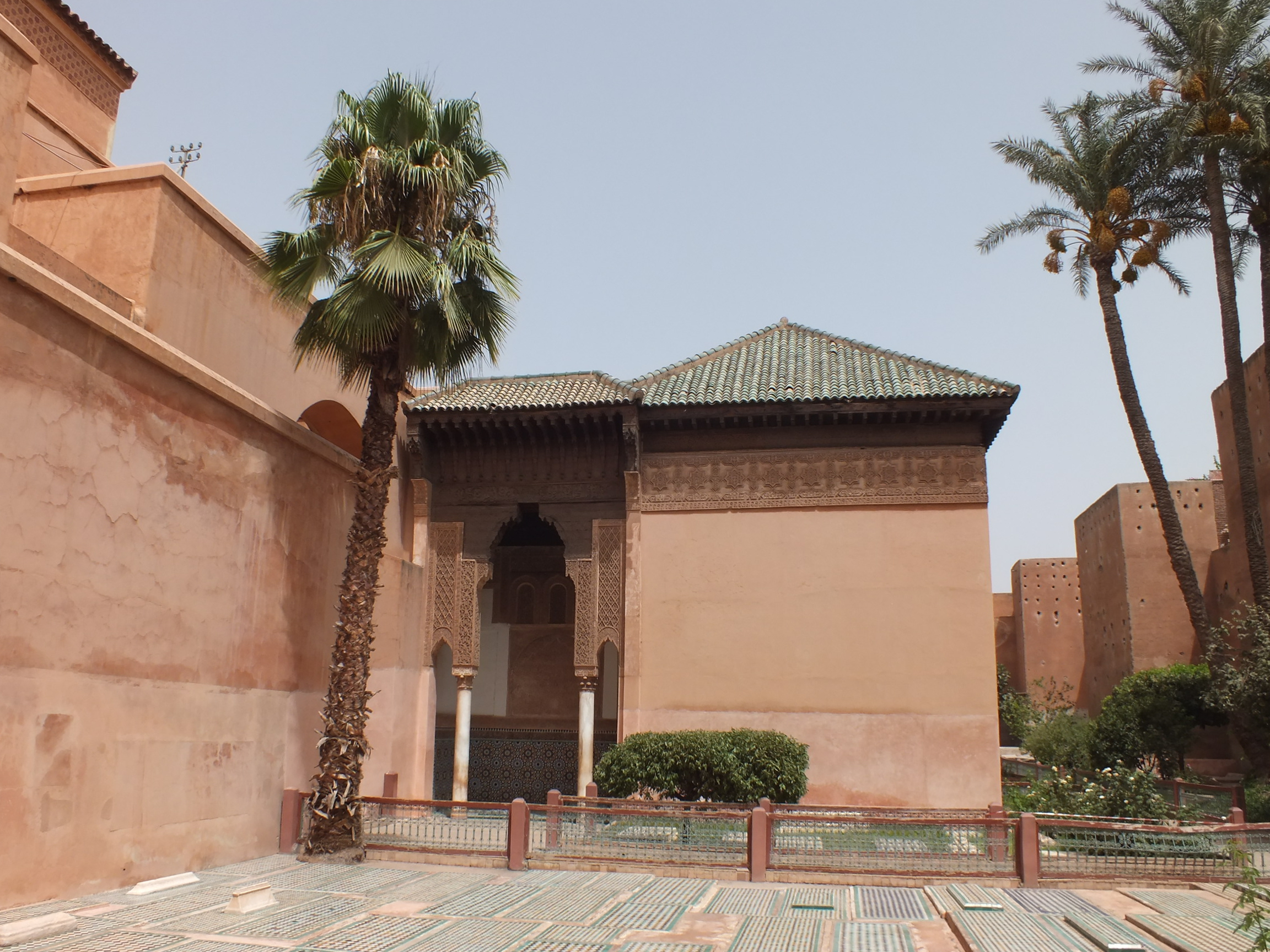
View towards the eastern mausoleum (Qubba of Lalla Mas'uda)

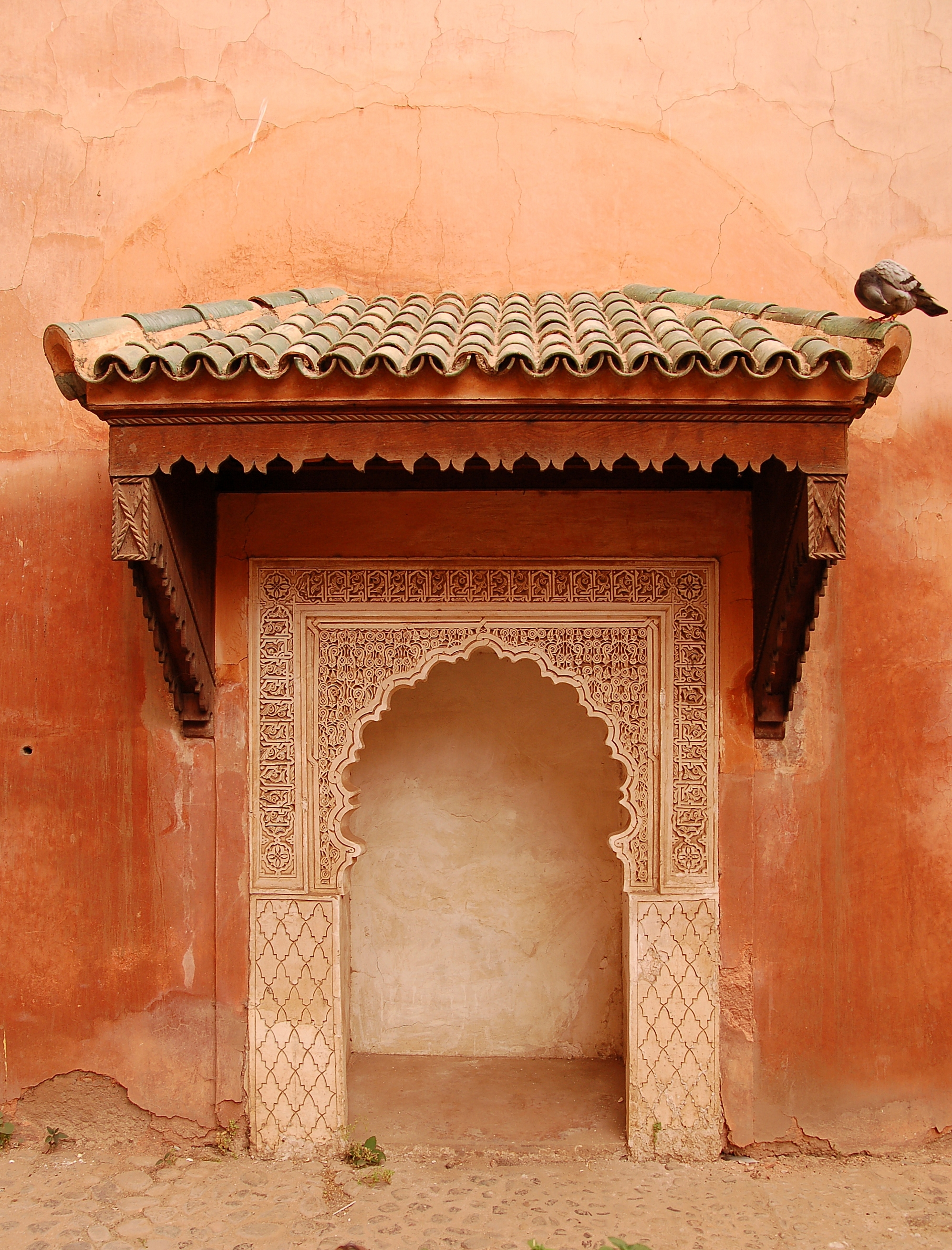
Decorative niche on the garden outer wall

The eastern building of the necropolis is the older of the two main buildings in the necropolis. It is often referred to as the Qubba of Lalla Mas'uda (qubba being an Arabic word for a mausoleum, usually domed). It consists of a small central square chamber (the so-called Chamber of Lalla Mas'uda), two rectangular loggia rooms on either side to the east and west, and a large rectangular chamber to the south (the so-called Grand Chamber) which connects directly to all three. In addition to the two loggias which open onto the gardens, there is an opening (a door or a former window) on the southern side of the large southern chamber. This unusual and almost symmetrical layout is believed to be the result of at least two different construction phases: a square mausoleum originally erected over the tomb of Muhammad al-Shaykh by Moulay Abdallah al-Ghalib and an expansion by Ahmad al-Mansur which added the other chambers around it (see history section above). The bulk of the building is built in brick. The decoration, also believed to be from al-Mansur's time, is of high quality throughout, even though some scholars believe the decoration was left unfinished when Ahmad al-Mansur stopped working on this building and began constructing the western mausoleum.

==== The Chamber of Lalla Mas'uda ====
The central chamber is also sometimes referred to as the Chamber of Lalla Mas'uda. It is believed to be the oldest structure in the necropolis, a relatively small mausoleum erected by Moulay Abdallah al-Ghalib between 1557 and 1574 over the tomb of his father, Muhammad al-Shaykh, the founder of the dynasty. Today it contains the tomb of Muhammad al-Shaykh, Lalla Mas'uda (a wife of al-Shaykh and mother of Ahmad al-Mansur), al-Ghalib himself, and possibly also Sultan Abd al-Malik (another son of al-Shaykh who ruled between 1576 and 1578).

The chamber is square, measuring 4 meters per side. The chamber is covered by a vault of very fine and intricate muqarnas (honeycomb or stalactite-like sculpting) made of stucco which retains a part of its polychrome painting in blue and gold (among other colours). The surfaces of the tiny niches in the muqarnas composition alternate between plain surfaces and surfaces carved with Moroccan/Andalusi arabesque motifs. The upper walls of the chamber are covered in intricate stucco decoration as well, in the form of arabesque and geometric compositions, while the lower walls are covered in zellij tile mosaics with geometric star patterns. Between these two parts are bands of Arabic inscriptions in both stucco and tilework. The floor is also covered in zellij paving (although in generally simpler motifs). On the chamber's northern side is a niche, resembling a mihrab, covered by its own canopy of muqarnas. This niche contains the tomb of Lalla Mas'uda. On the lower western wall of the niche is a carved marble panel with a dedicatory text to Lalla Mas'uda. The panel is the best preserved piece of its kind in the whole necropolis, thanks in part to the fact that it was originally protected by wooden shutters. In addition to its rich carvings, it retains hints of former red paint.

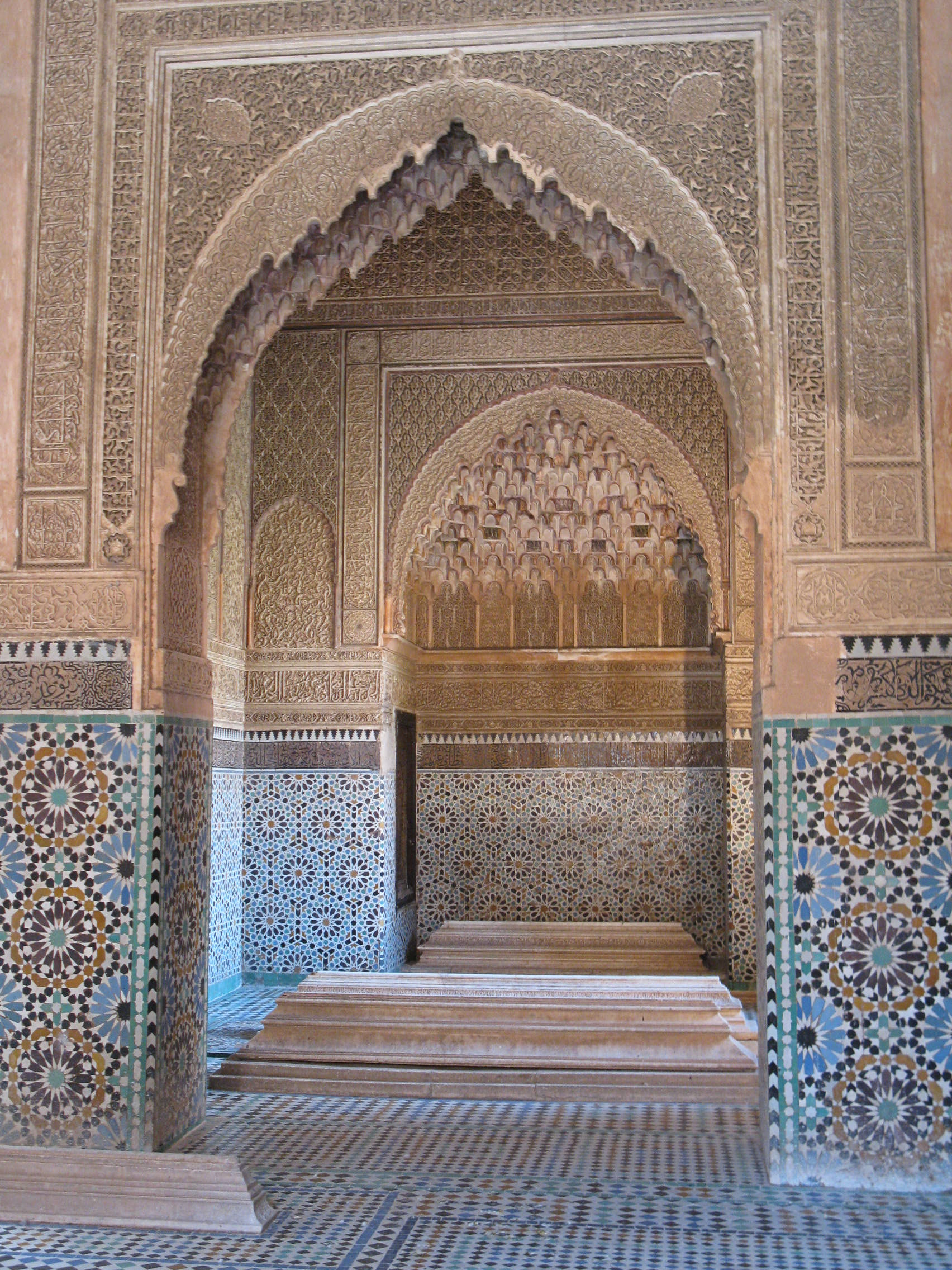
View towards the Chamber of Lalla Mas'uda, through the doorway from the southern chamber

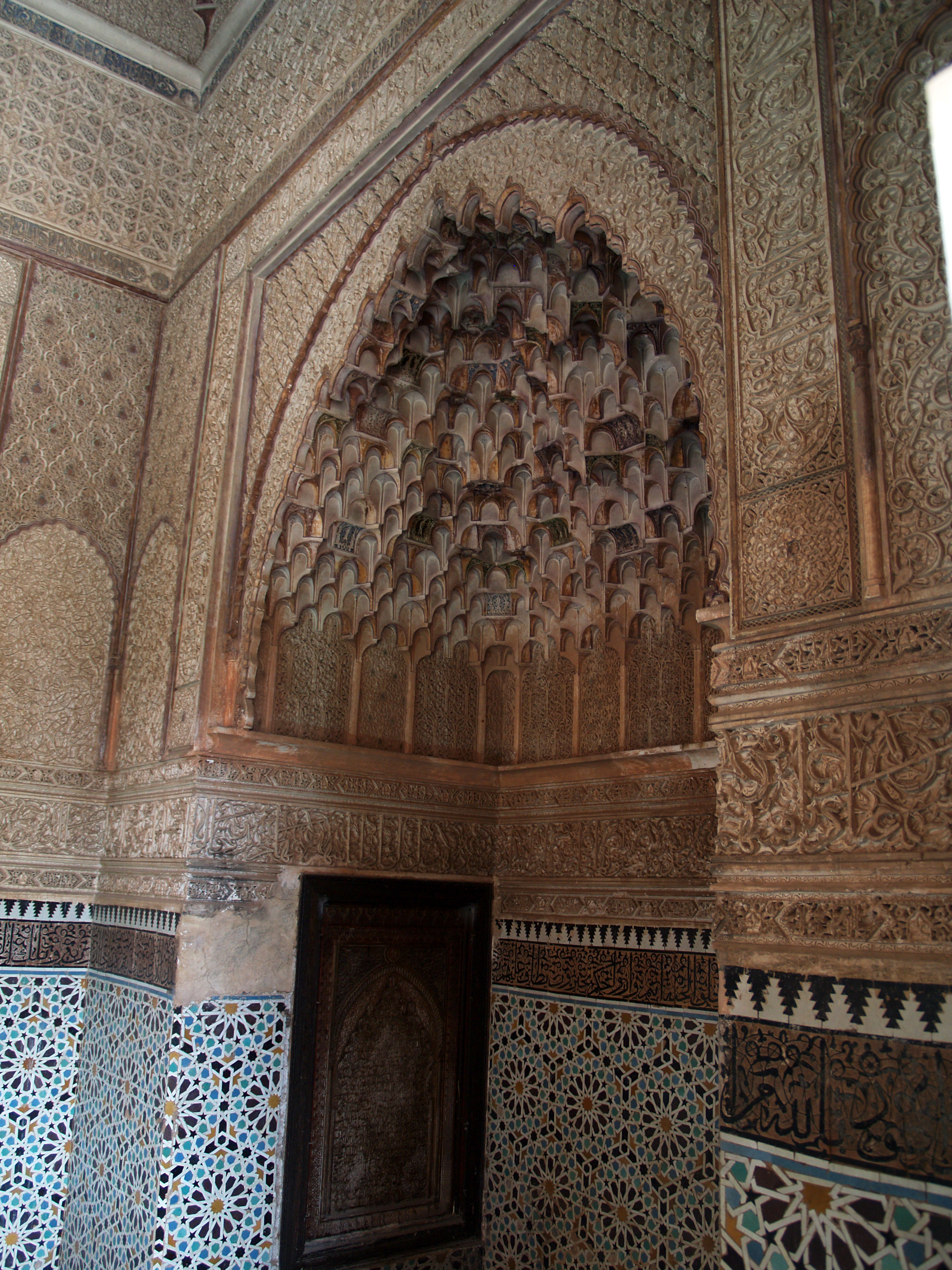
The niche over the tomb of Lalla Mas'uda. The dedicatory marble inscription is visible at the bottom.

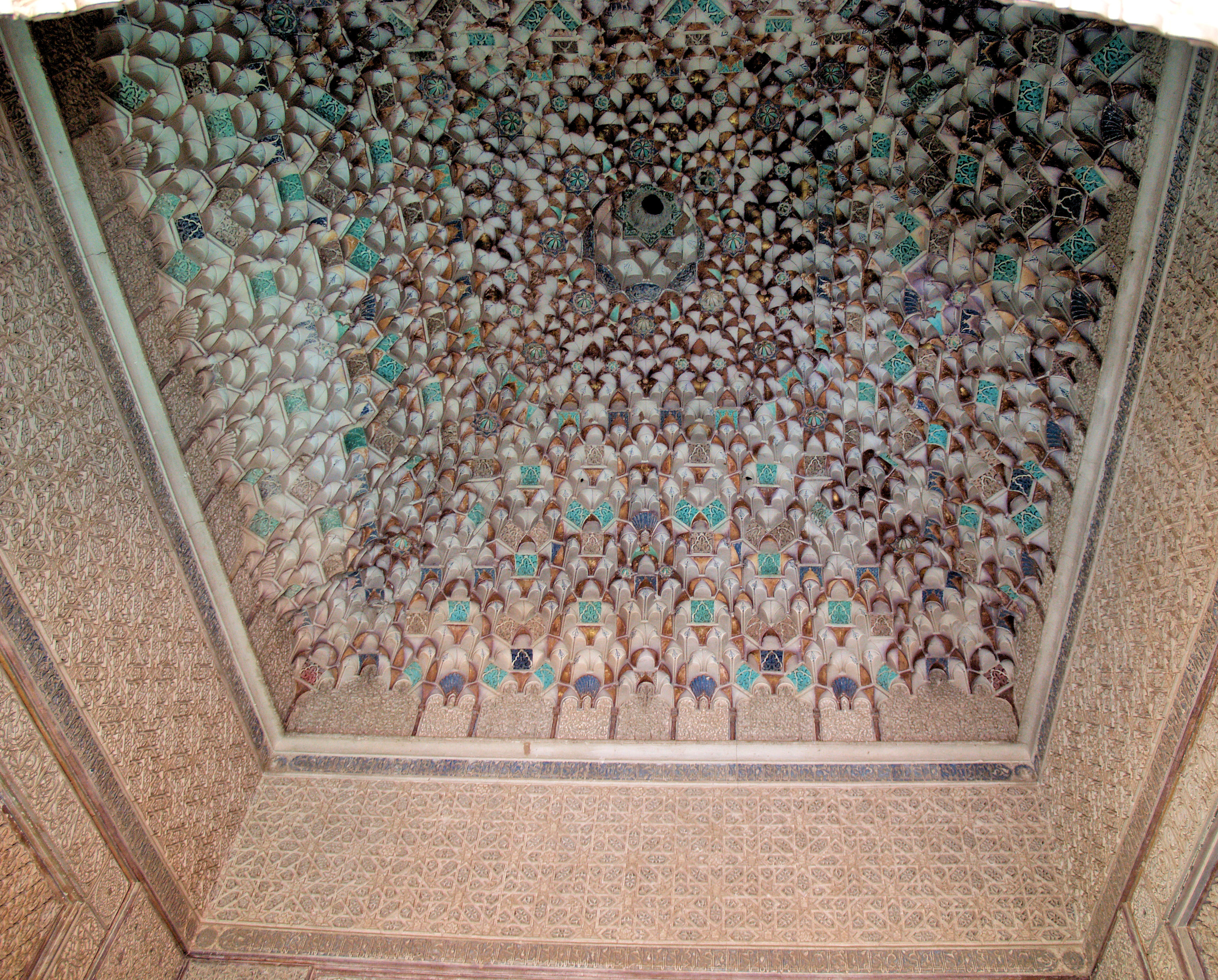
The muqarnas ceiling over the chamber

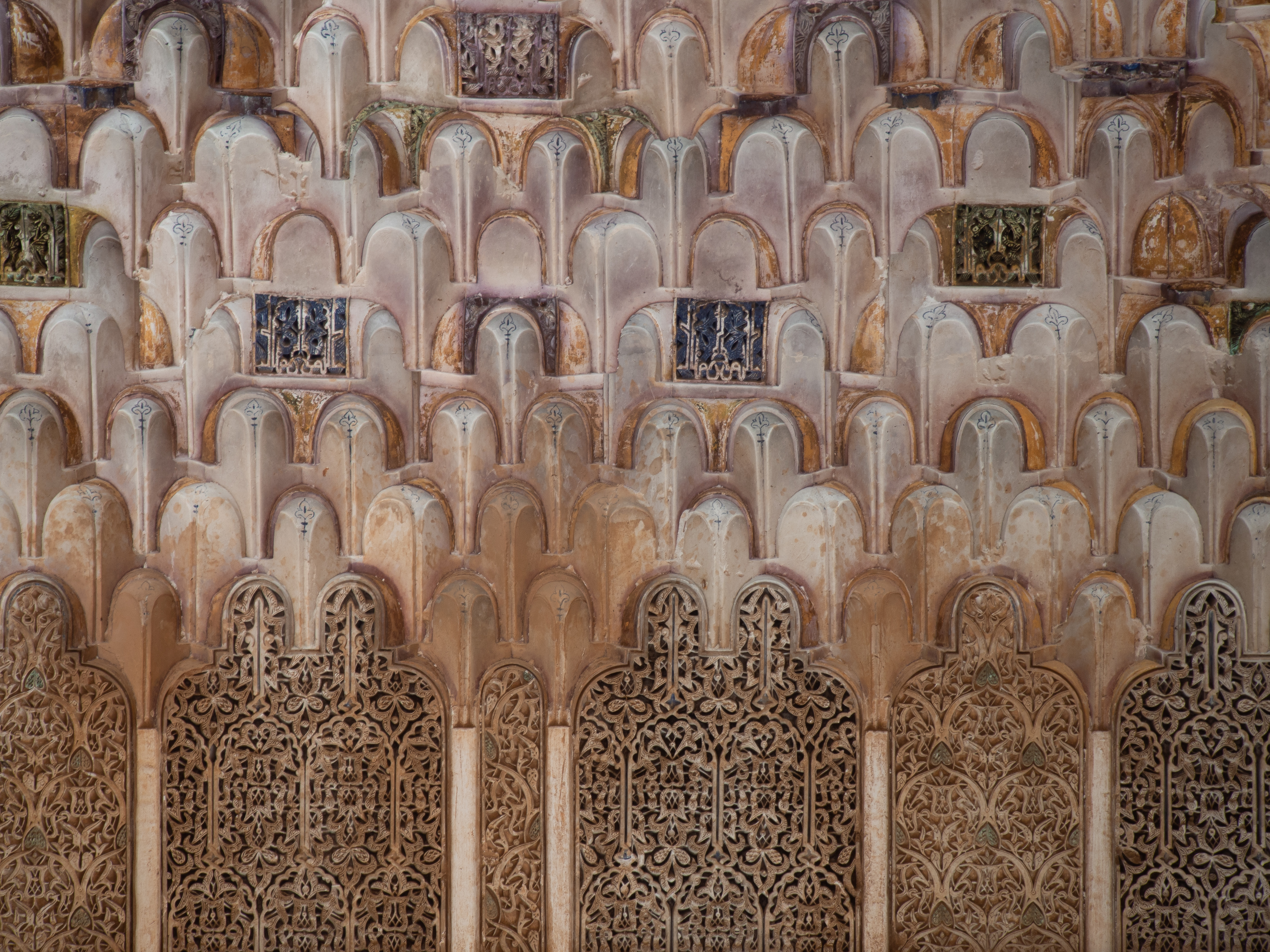
Detail of the muqarnas of the niche over Lalla Mas'uda's tomb

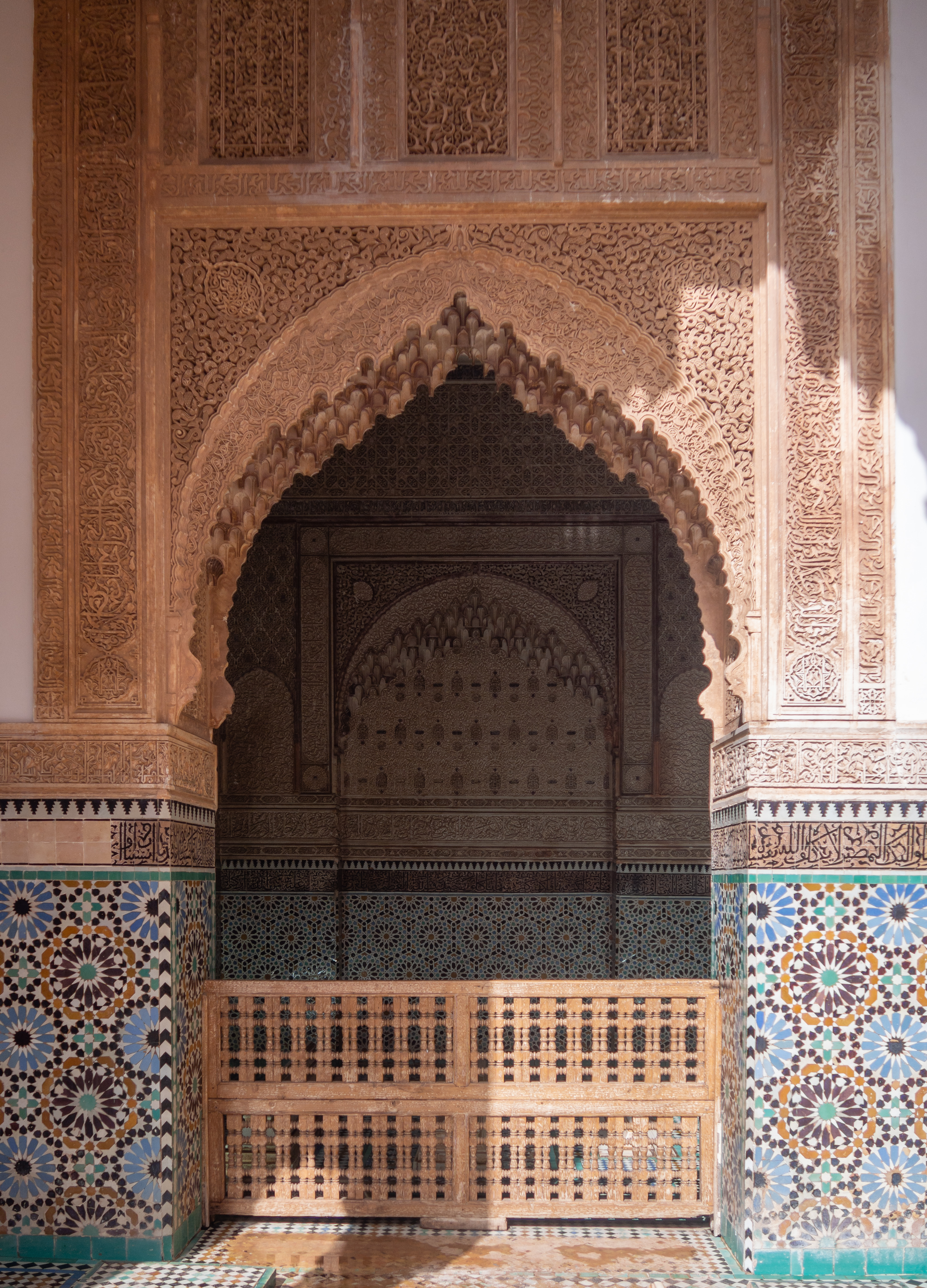
View towards the Chamber of Lalla Mas'uda from the eastern loggia

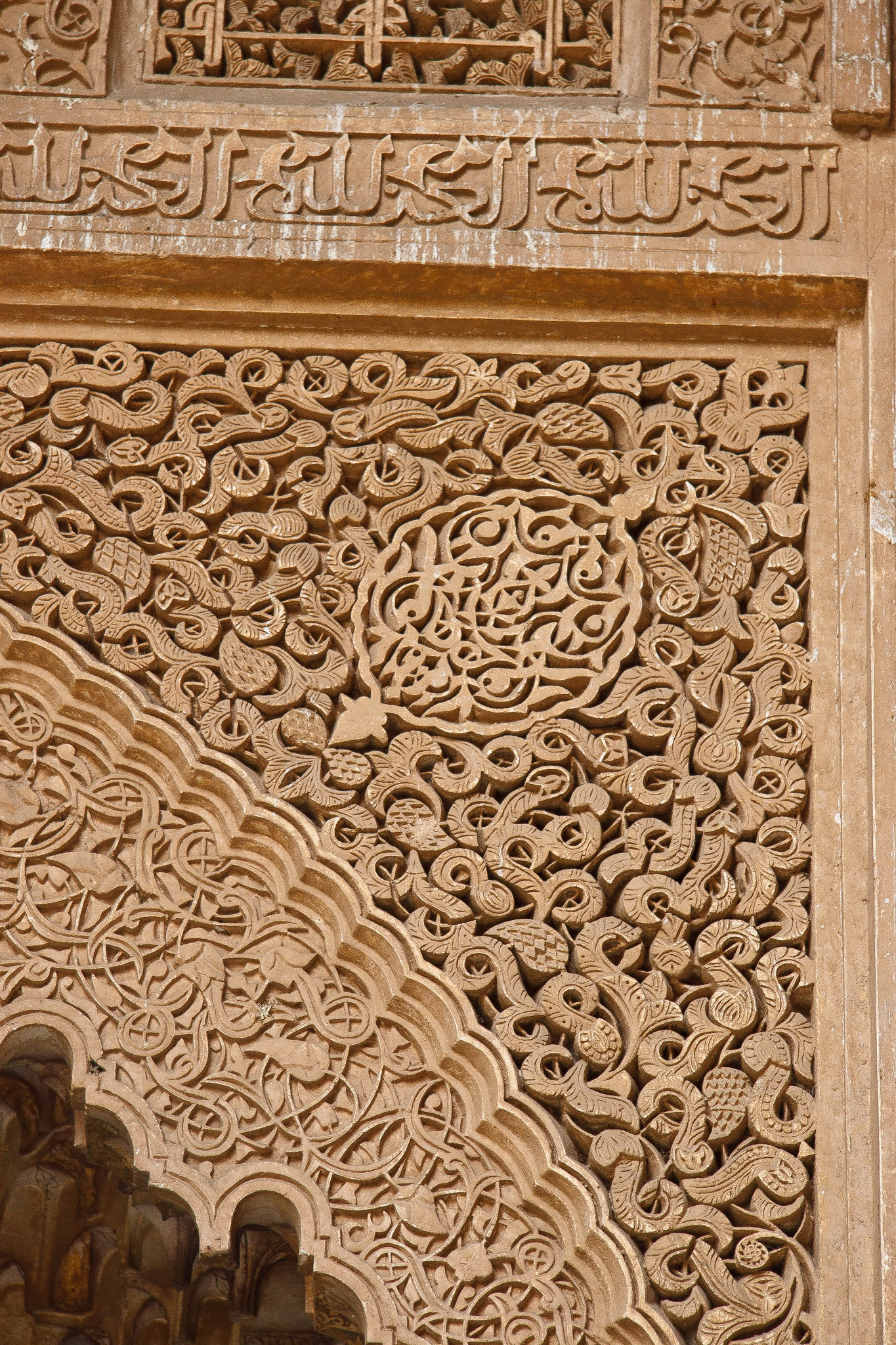
Detail of the stucco archway into the Chamber of Lalla Mas'uda from the eastern loggia

==== The Grand Chamber ====
Lalla Masu'da's chamber connects to the large rectangular chamber to the south through a doorway crowned by an intricate stucco arch with muqarnas intrados (inner surfaces of the arch), which in turn is surrounded by some of the highest-quality stucco carving. The upper walls of this chamber are mostly bare but the lower walls feature zellij tilework with even more complex 16-sided star patterns. The chamber is covered by a berchla roof (a Moroccan wooden framework ceiling with particular stylistic geometric arrangements) with remnants of its former colours. The floor is covered in tilework again along with various tombs. The chamber measures 10 by 6 meters.

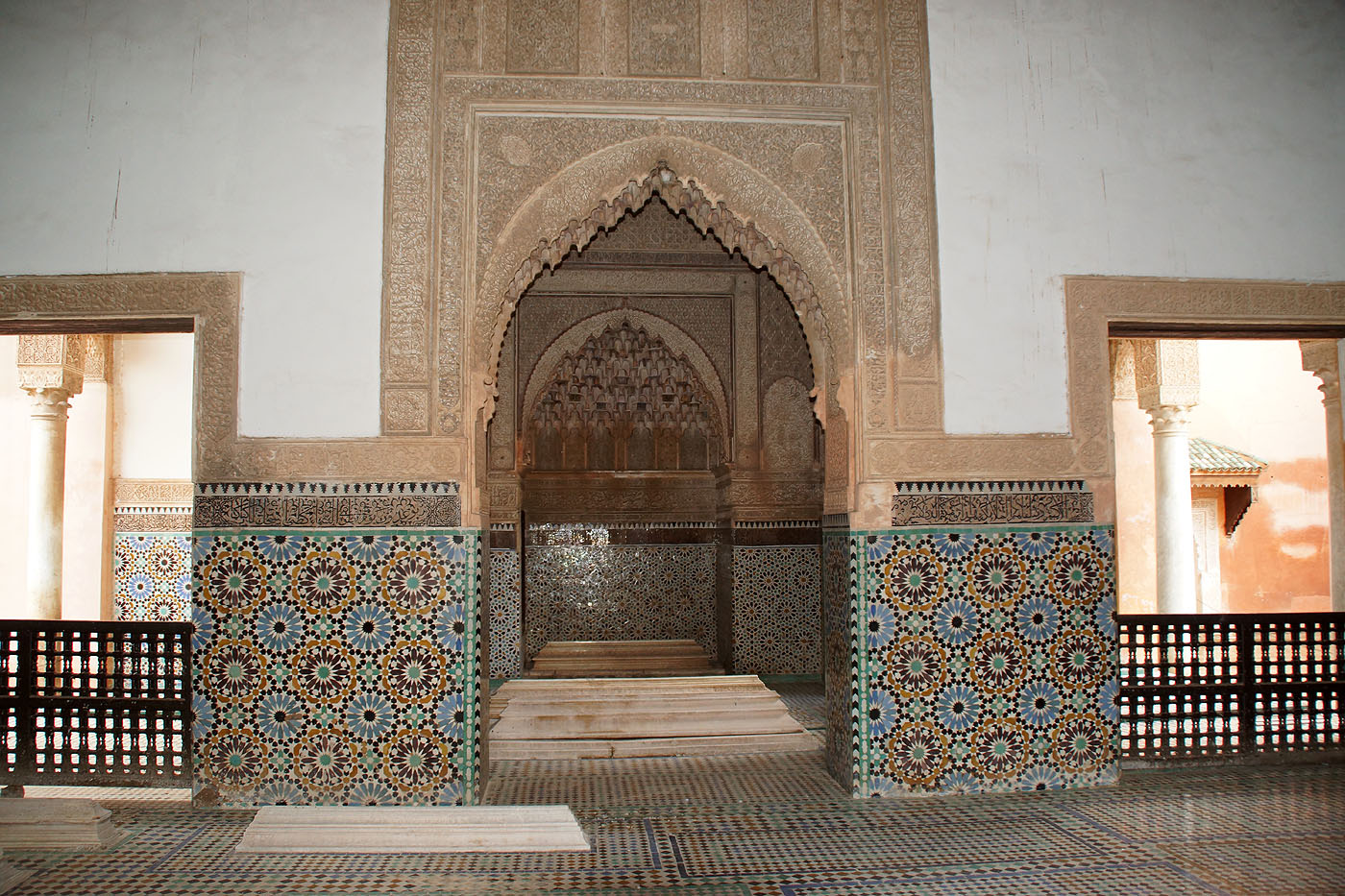
View of the Grand Chamber. In the center is the muqarnas archway leading to the mausoleum of Muhammad al-Shaykh and Lalla Mas'uda.

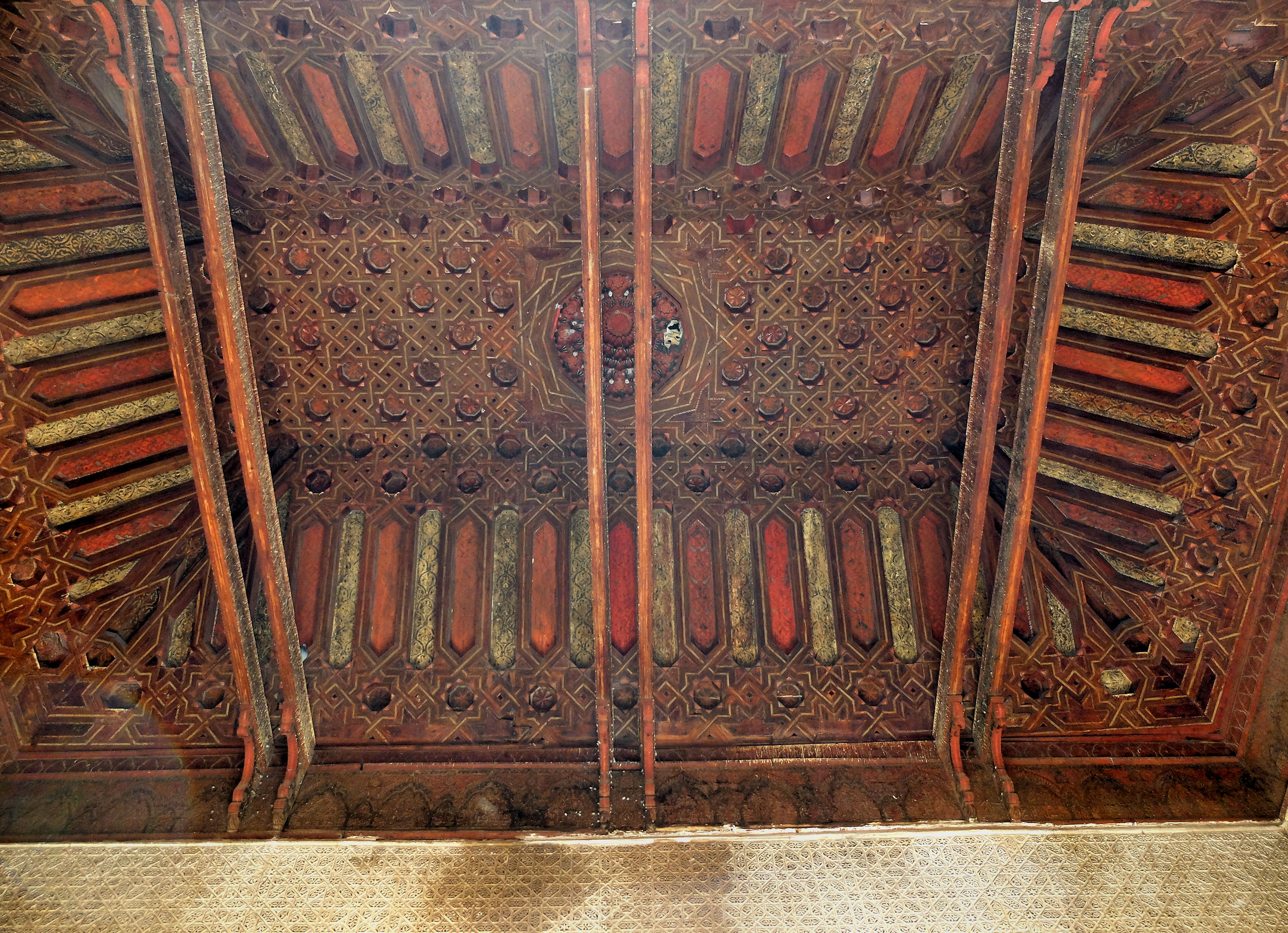
View of the berchla wood-frame ceiling

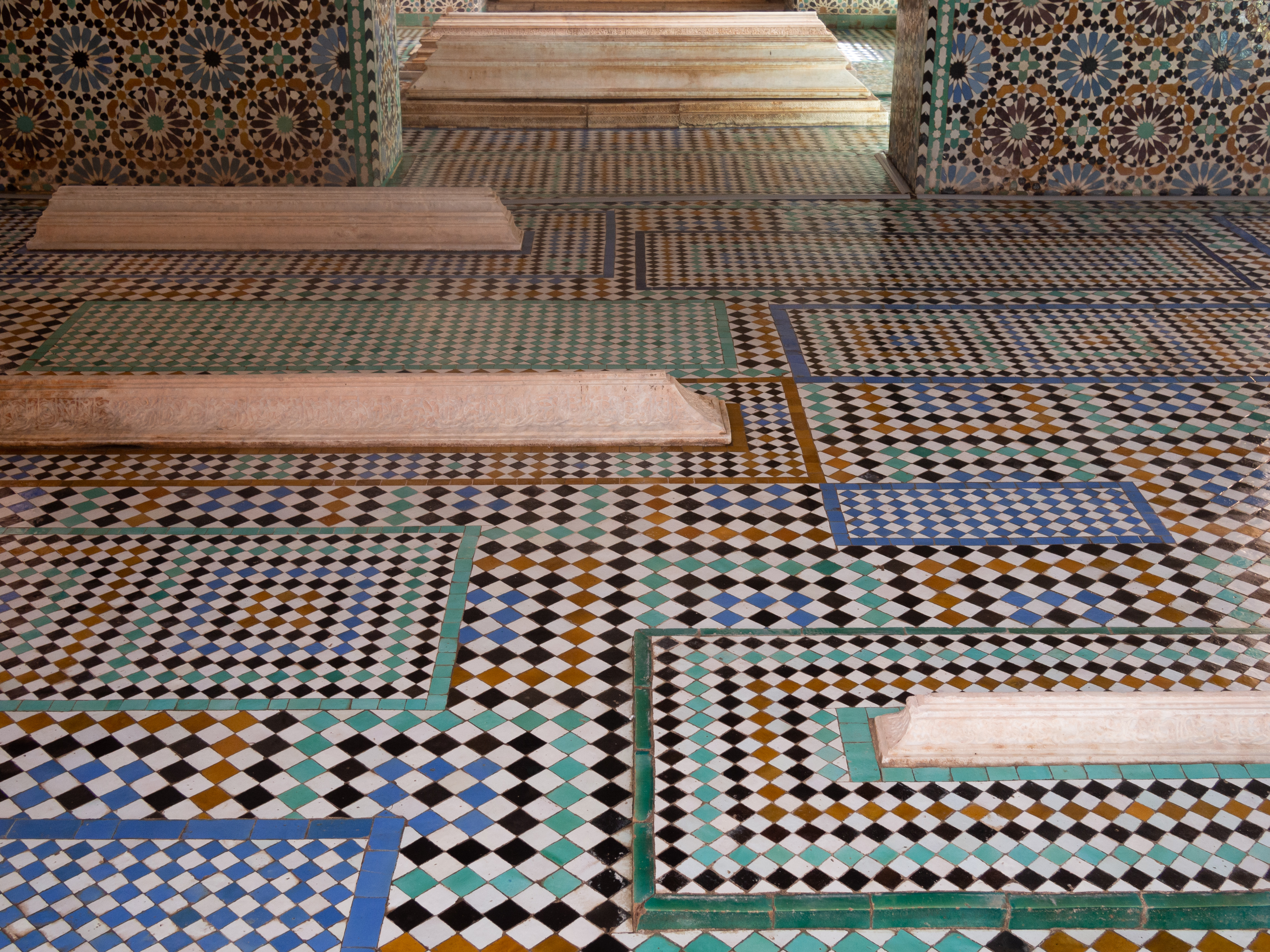
Some of the tombs along the floor of the chamber

==== The loggias ====
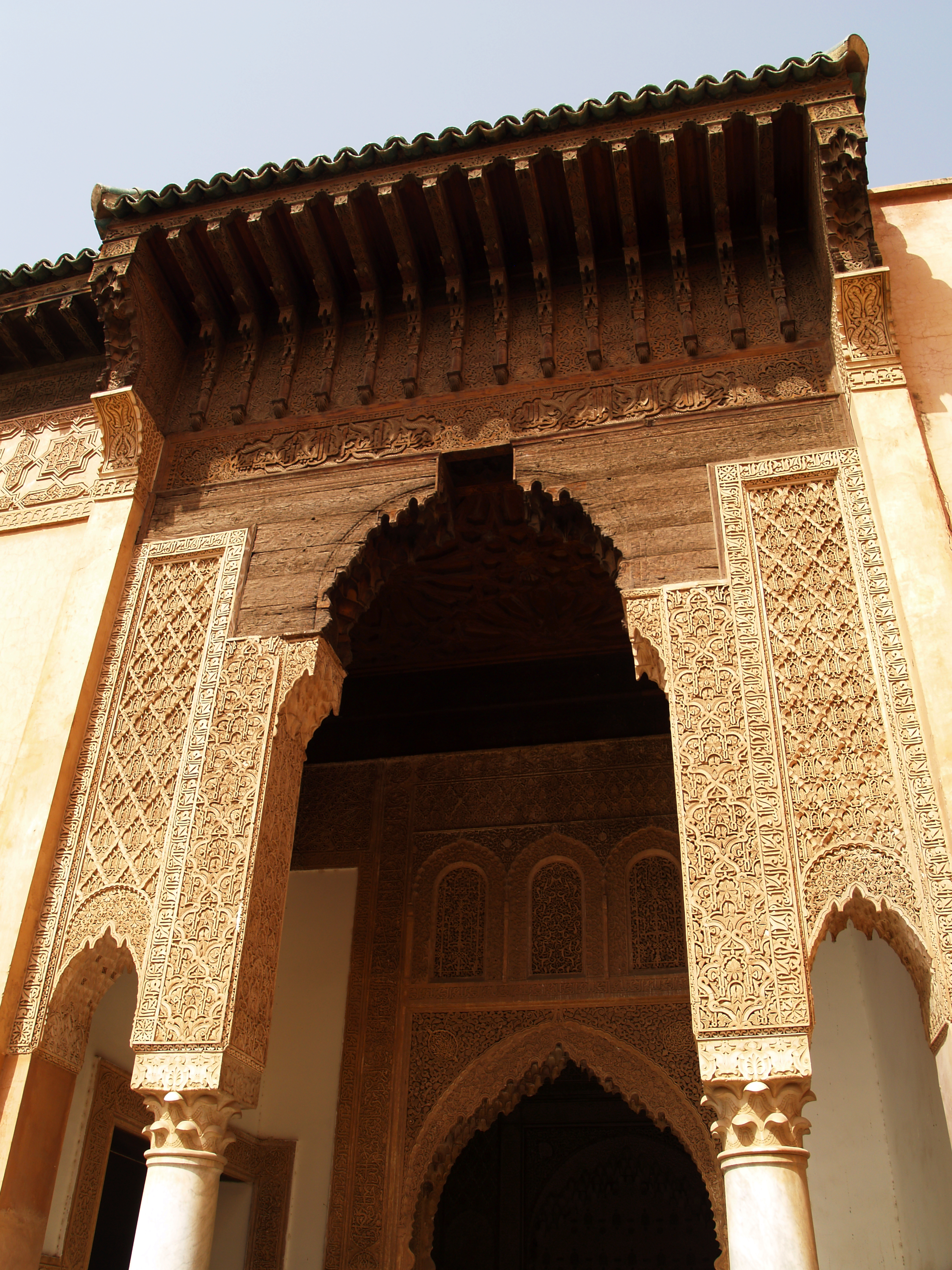
One of the loggias.

On either side of the mausoleum are small rectangular chambers (4 by 2 meters) that open to the outside through richly decorated loggias. The eastern loggia room has doorways opening onto both the central mausoleum chamber (via another intricate archway) and the southern Grand Chamber, while the western loggia connects only to the southern chamber. The loggias are triple-arched: a cedar wood canopy forms an arch resting on stucco-carved pillars that in turn rest on marble columns, with smaller muqarnas-carved arches crossing the space between the columns and the main walls of the structure. The wooden canopies feature a band carved with cartouches of Arabic calligraphy featuring a Qur'anic verse from the Surah al-Ahzab. The stucco carvings are again very fine and feature a variety of motifs. A band of stucco featuring a star-like pattern runs around the rest of the building on the outside, just below the wooden roof.

=== The western mausoleum ===
The western mausoleum building is divided into three chambers: the Chamber of the Mihrab, the Chamber of the Twelve Columns, and the Chamber of the Three Niches. It is believed to date entirely from the reign of Ahmad al-Mansur, though it contains many tombs from after his time as well.

==== Chamber of the Mihrab ====
The southernmost chamber was intended to be a small mosque or prayer room, which is why it features a mihrab on its south/southeast wall. In Islamic architecture the mihrab is a niche or alcove symbolizing the qibla (the direction of prayer). The mihrab here resembles that of the Ben Youssef Madrasa (also Saadian in origin): a horseshoe arch surrounded by elaborate stucco decoration and hiding a small muqarnas cupola inside. The decoration of the lower parts of the mihrab, however, appears to have been left unfinished: the outlines of a pattern have been traced but they have not been filled-in and carved. This is believed to be due to Ahmad al-Mansur dying before the decoration was completely finished and his successors lacking the will or the resources to finish it. A total of 8 engaged columns, made out of veined marble, are arranged around the base of the mihrab. The rest of the chamber is a large rectangular space marked by four columns supporting arches. The columns and the arches split the upper space of the chamber into 9 rectangular areas, with each division having its own wooden ceiling with star patterns. The ceiling in front of the mihrab, however, is different and instead features a large pyramid-shaped vault of intricate muqarnas (similar in style to the ceiling of the Chamber of Lalla Mas'uda). Since the vault has a square outline, it transitions into the rectangular space with two more sloped surfaces of muqarnas on either side.

This mosque chamber was originally the only entrance into the building. The central mausoleum of al-Mansur (the Chamber of Twelve Columns) is entered via another ornate muqarnas archway directly opposite the mihrab. Nowadays, however, the floor of the chamber is covered with the tombs of family members of the 'Alawi dynasty, as well as, reputedly, the tomb of the 'Alawi sultan Moulay al-Yazid. As a result, visitors are generally not allowed to walk inside.

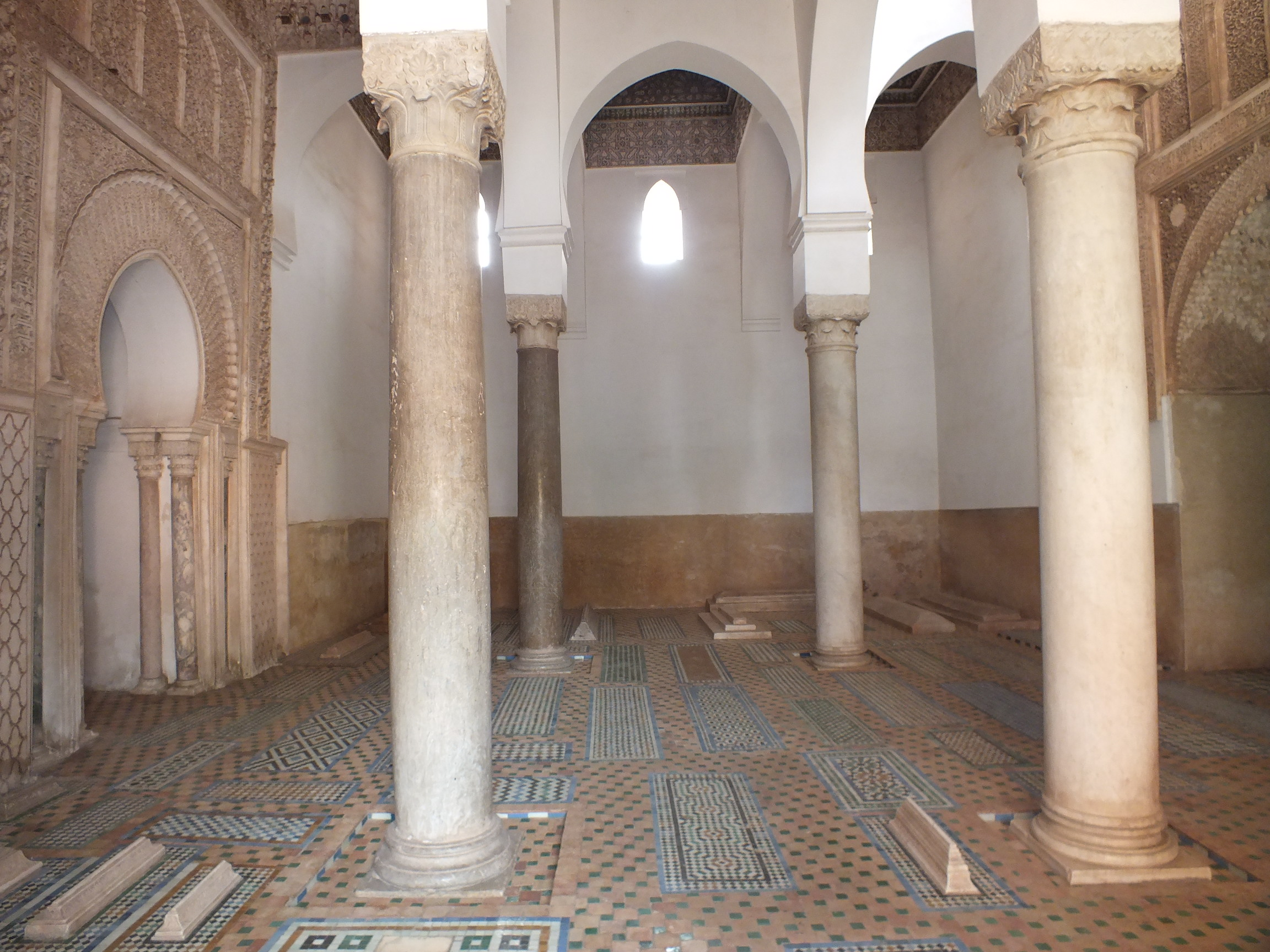
View of the Chamber of the Mihrab (the mihrab is on the left)

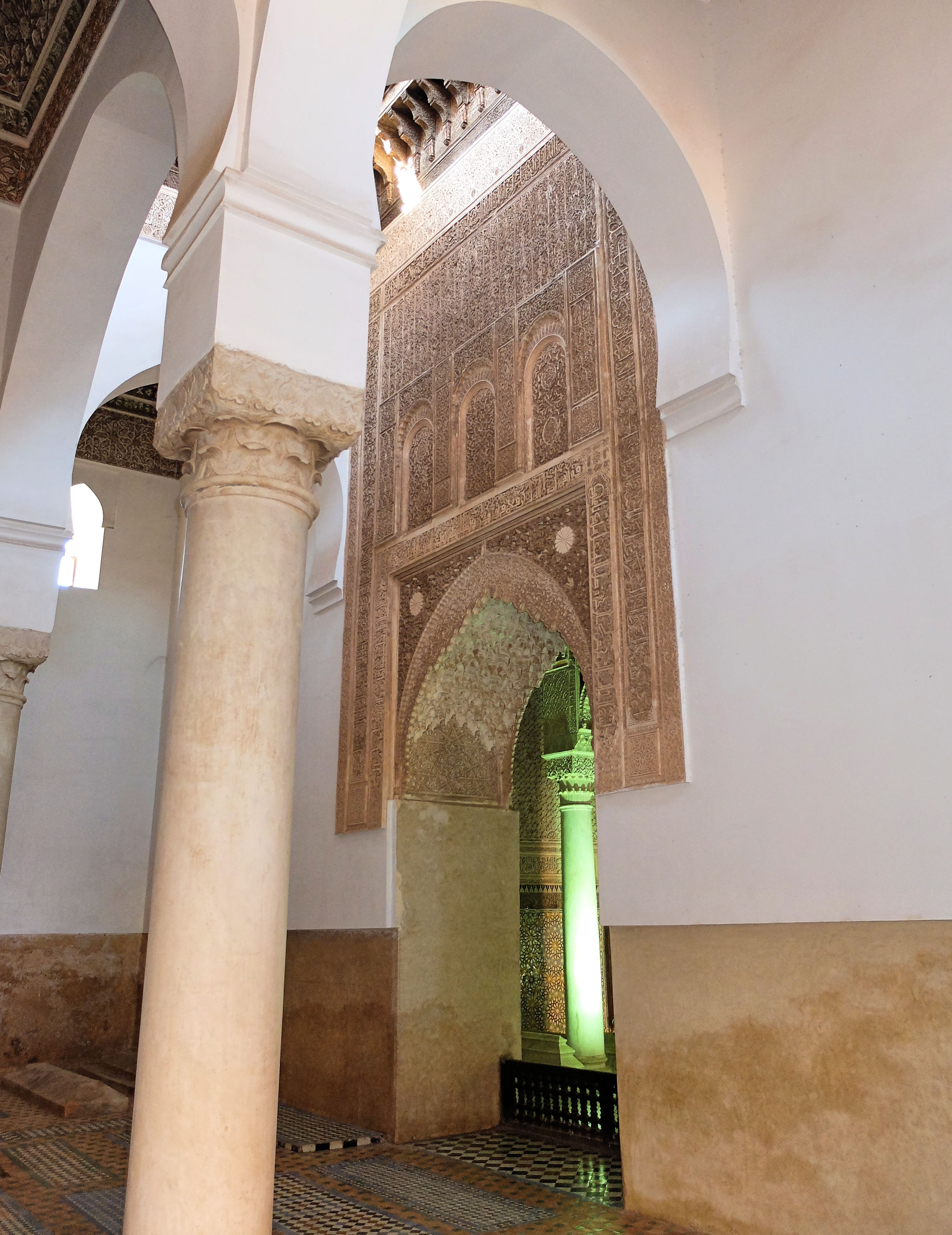
The doorway from the Chamber of the Mihrab to the Chamber of the Twelve Columns

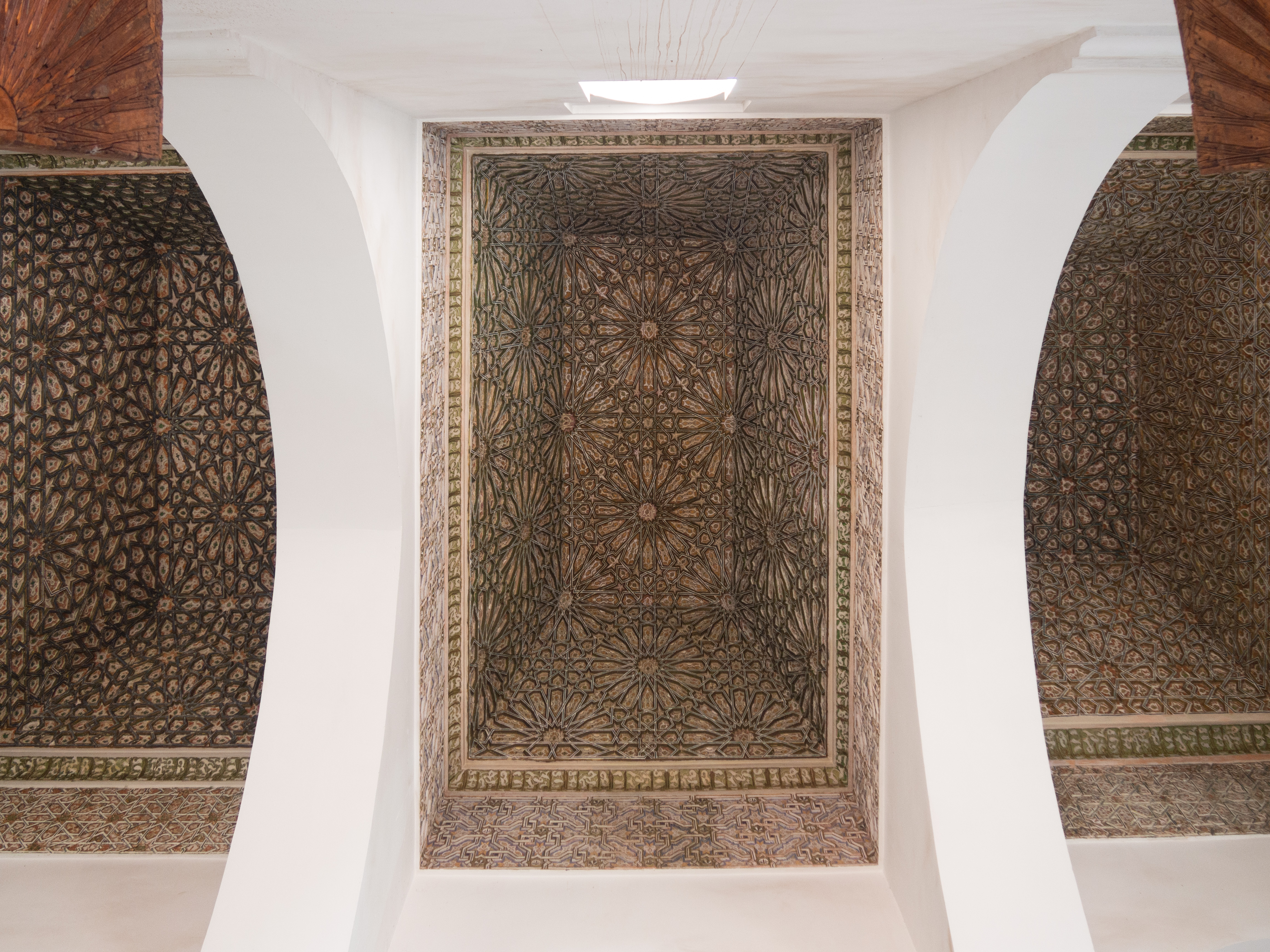
The ceilings over the Chamber of the Mihrab

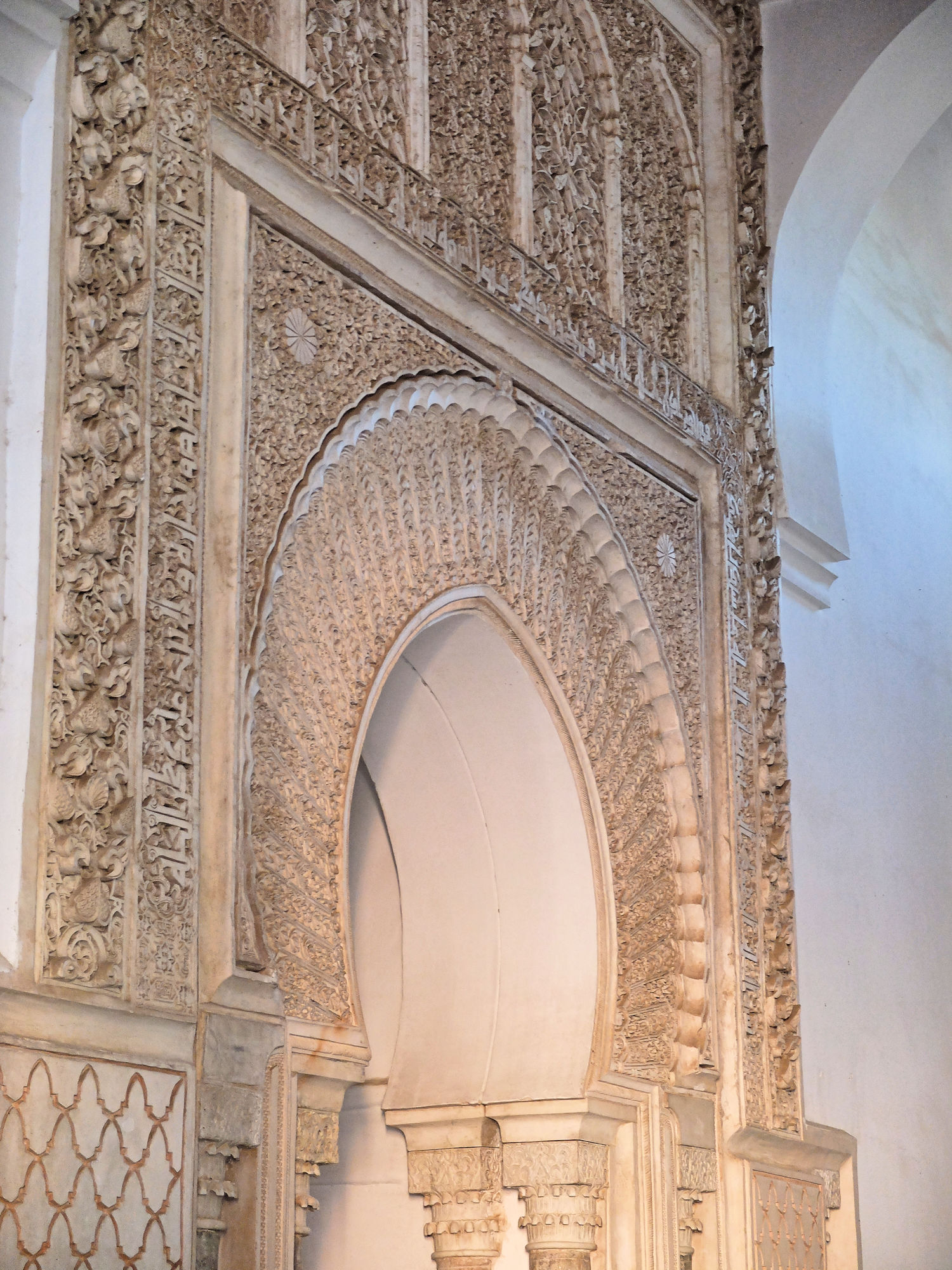
Close-up of the mihrab

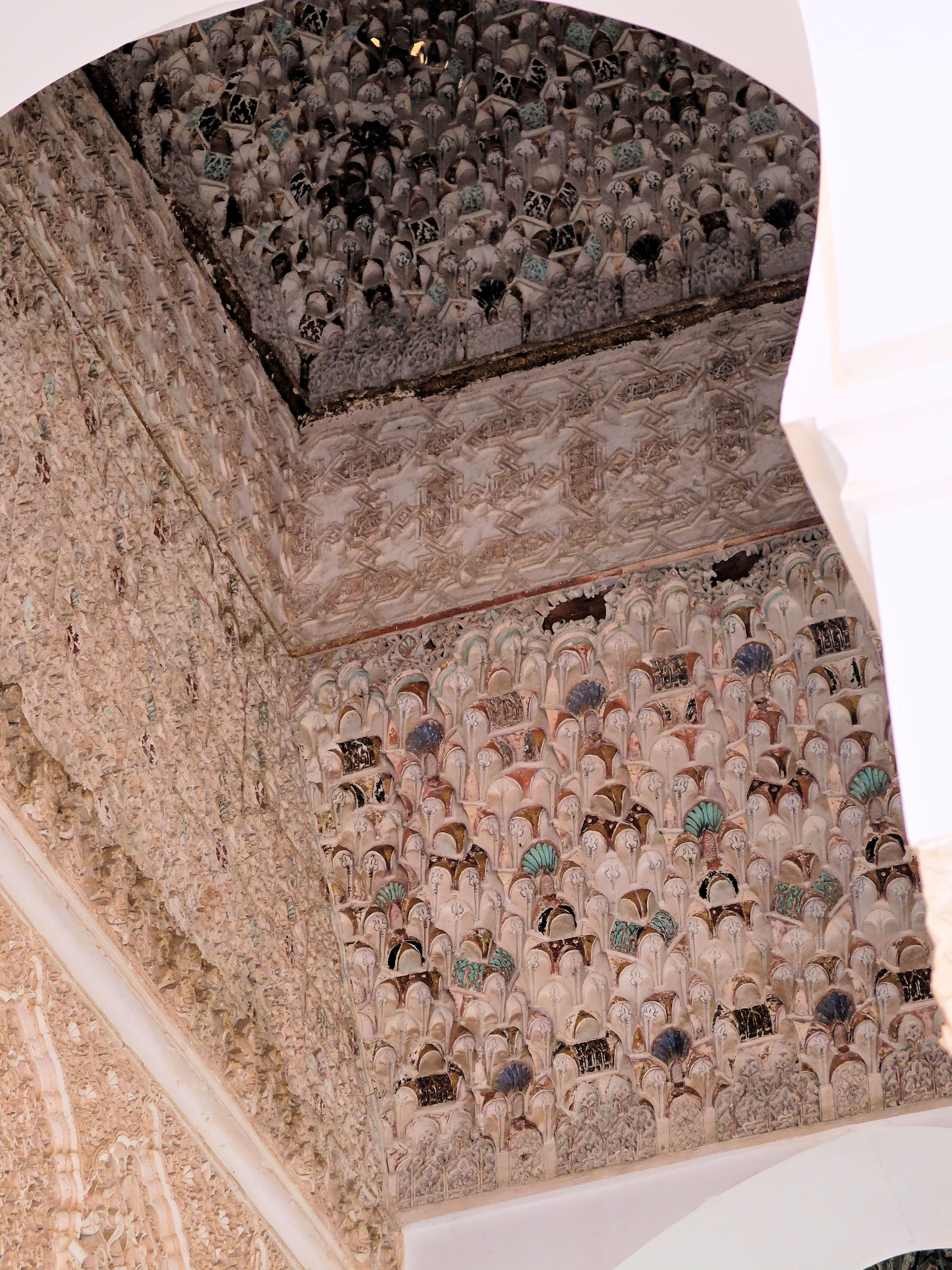
Partial view of the muqarnas vault in front of the mihrab

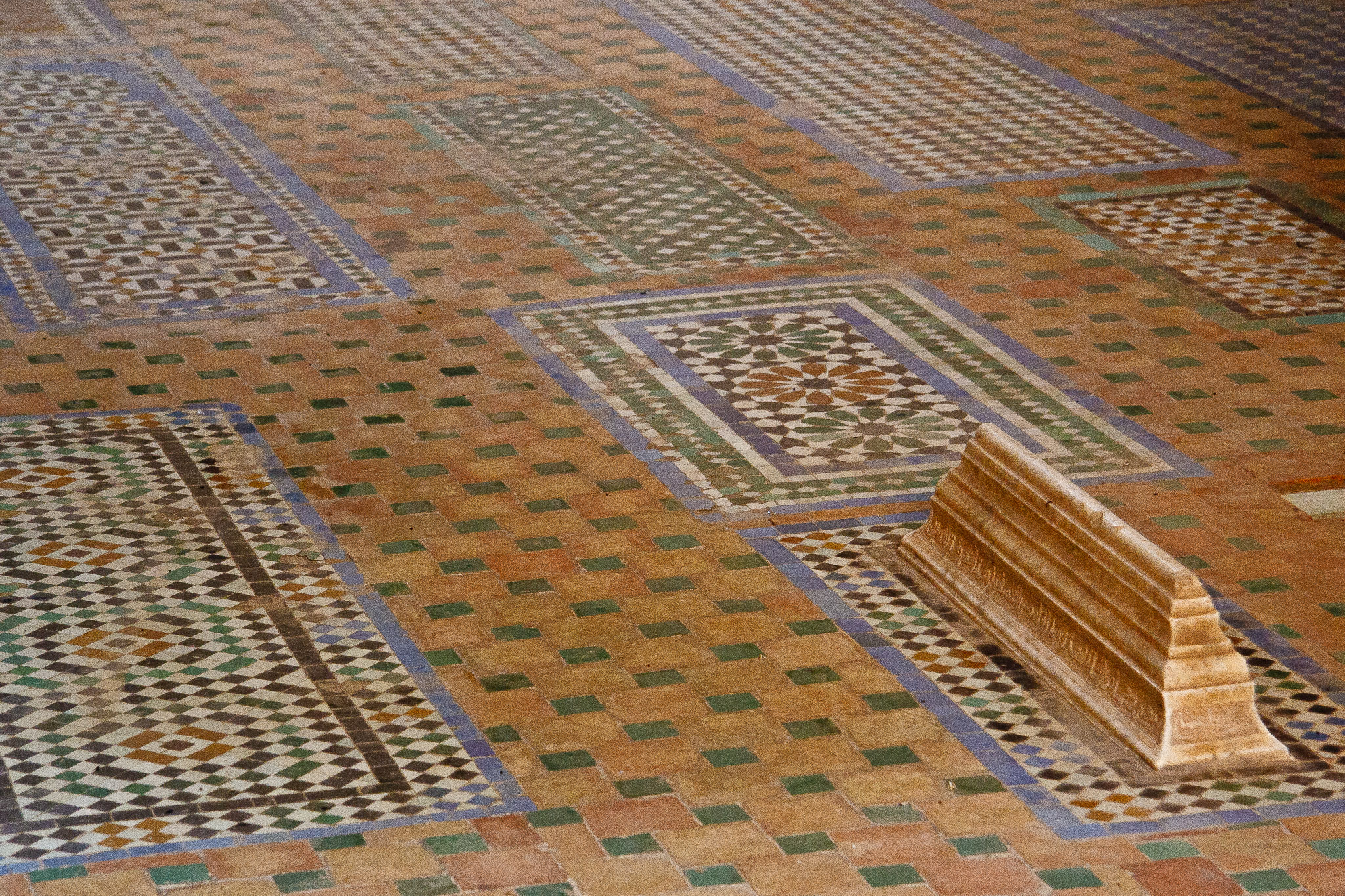
'Alawi tombs in the chamber

==== Chamber of the Twelve Columns (Mausoleum of Ahmad al-Mansur) ====
This is the grand mausoleum chamber of Ahmad al-Mansur and the most richly decorated chamber in the entire necropolis, generally considered the highlight of the complex. Its layout follows a previously established plan seen at the Mausoleum of Sidi Yusuf ibn Ali in Marrakech (built by Moulay Abdallah al-Ghalib) and in the remains of the rawda cemetery at the Alhambra of Granada. The chamber is square, measuring 10 meters per side and rising 12 meters high. A slightly smaller square is formed within the chamber by the twelve columns of Carrara marble symmetrically arranged in groups of three around the center of the room. The capitals of the marble columns have simple profiles but are covered in high-relief vegetal or arabesque carvings. What is more exceptional is that each group of three columns supports two small muqarnas arches which are also made out of marble (instead of the usual wood or stucco) and yet appear as intricately carved as the other elements in the room. The space between the column groups is spanned by wider muqarnas arches carved in stucco, but the consoles or corbels on which their bases rest are also made out of marble. Overall, the craftsmen who built the chamber took great care to make the transition from marble to stucco nearly imperceptible, so that the two highly different materials seem to blend naturally together. The use of red paint to highlight the stucco forms is still visible in many areas.

The elaborate cedar wood ceilings of the chamber are also high achievements of Moroccan and Saadian art. Because of the square-within-a-square layout and the arches springing from the corners of the inner square, there is one large ceiling in the center and eight smaller square and rectangular ceilings around it. The central wood-frame ceiling is shaped like a square dome or cupola and is covered in a star pattern. Both the shape and the pattern are similar to, but less extensive than, the famous ceiling of the Hall of Ambassadors in the Alhambra palace. Below the cupola itself is a transitional zone of wood-carved muqarnas, and below this are two bands of painted decoration with arabesque motifs and Arabic calligraphic inscriptions. The rectangular ceilings along the sides of the chamber are flat but feature more geometric motifs as well as miniature cupolas of muqarnas. Lastly, the smaller square ceilings in the corners of the chamber are full muqarnas cupolas. The upper bands of wood running just below the ceilings here are also decorated with arch motifs as well as Kufic Arabic motifs. The ceilings are all painted in predominantly red and gold colours, still preserved today.

The surfaces of the chamber walls are covered in carved stucco as well as the more usual zellij tiling along their lower parts. At the very center of the room is the tombstone of Ahmad al-Mansur. To his immediate right (from the perspective of present-day visitors seeing the room) is the tombstone of his son, Sultan Moulay Zidan (died 1627), and to his immediate left is the tombstone of Sultan Muhammad al-Shaykh al-Saghir (died 1654–55). Also in this room are the tombs of al-Mansur's wife, Lalla Aisha as-Shabaniyya (died 1623) and of Sultan Abd al-Malik II (died 1631). All of their tombstones, of a type called a mqabriya, consist of an elongated marble bloc carved with Arabic epitaphs on arabesque backgrounds. The mqabriyas of these five Saadians are particularly large and ornate, and are believed to have been made by the same workshop of artisans. The lesser tombstones of other dynasty members are scattered around the room. Curiously, the marble inscription plaque embedded in the back wall of the chamber is dedicated to Muhammad al-Shaykh (who is buried in the other mausoleum across the gardens to the east), and was apparently moved here from his tombstone in the eastern mausoleum. Why or when it was moved here is unknown.

Today, since the original entrance via the Chamber of the Mihrab is off-limits, visitors enter to the edge of the chamber via an opening in the eastern wall of the mausoleum, directly from the outside. This opening was originally only a window, similar to windows found in the outer walls of other shrines in Morocco where Muslim pedestrians on the street are able to offer prayers or gifts to the deceased without having to enter the sanctuary.

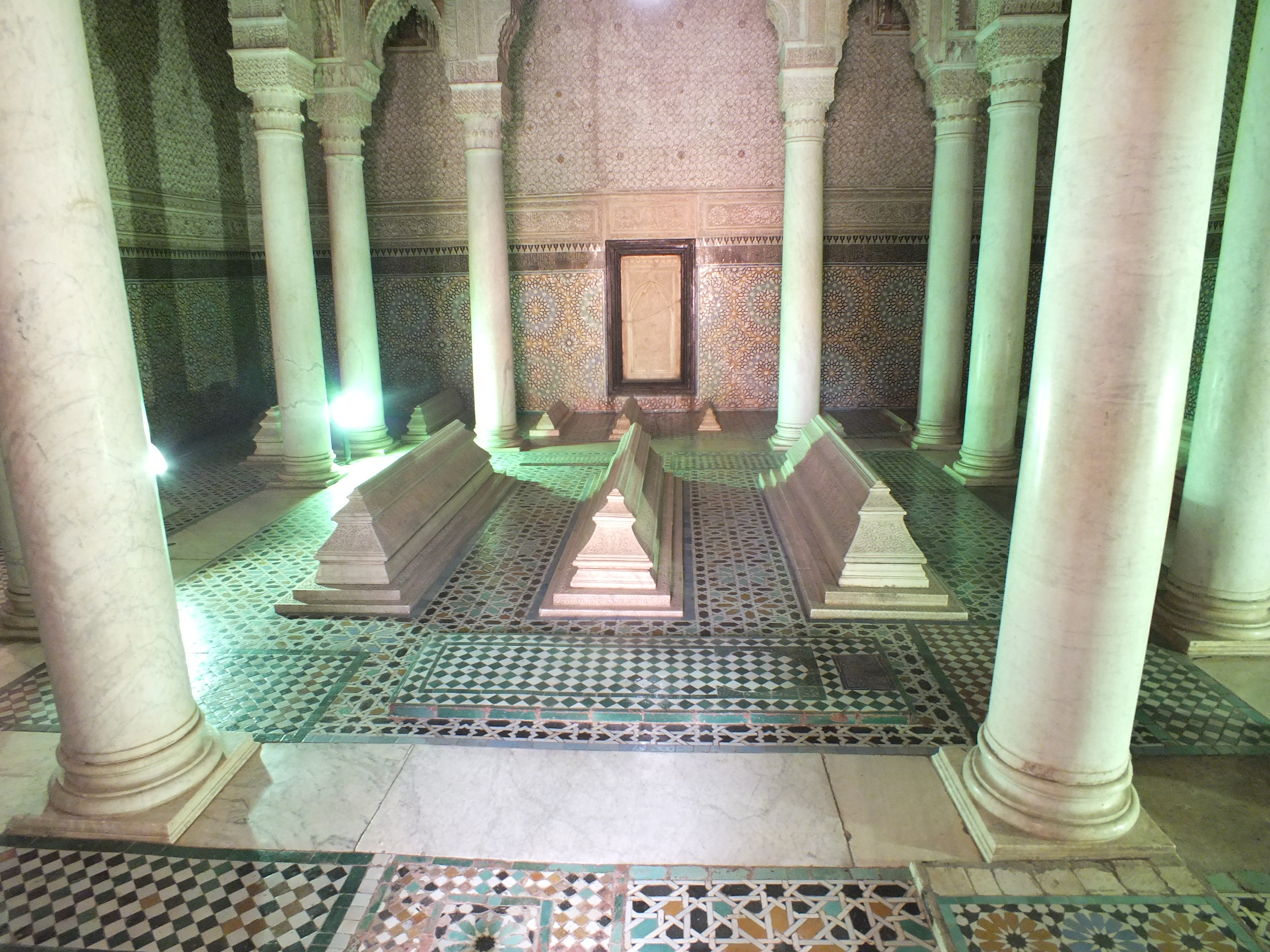
Chamber of the Twelve Columns; the middle tombstone is that of Ahmad al-Mansur

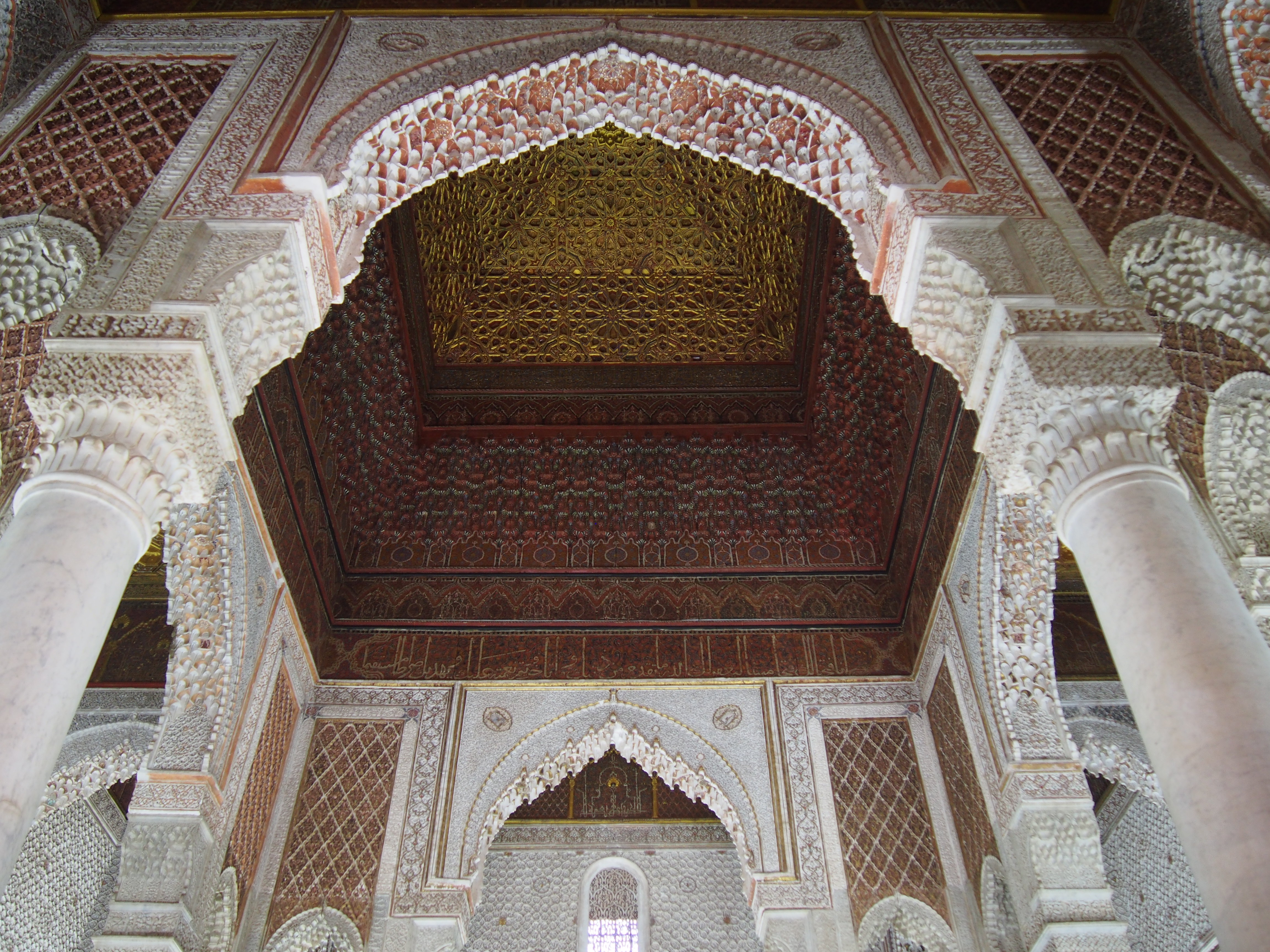
View of the chamber's ceiling, with glimpse of the central ceiling in particular

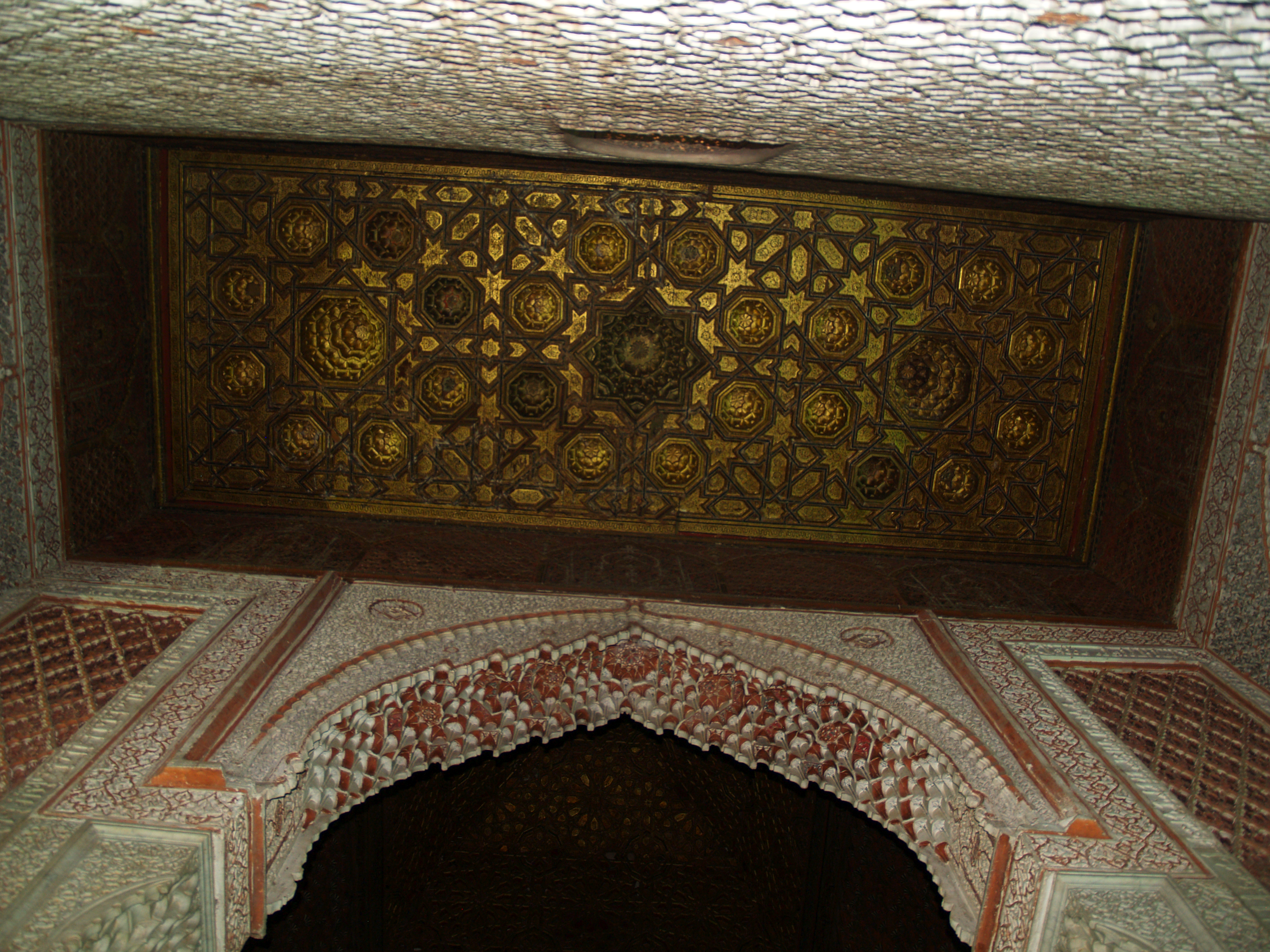
One of the rectangular ceilings along the sides of the chamber

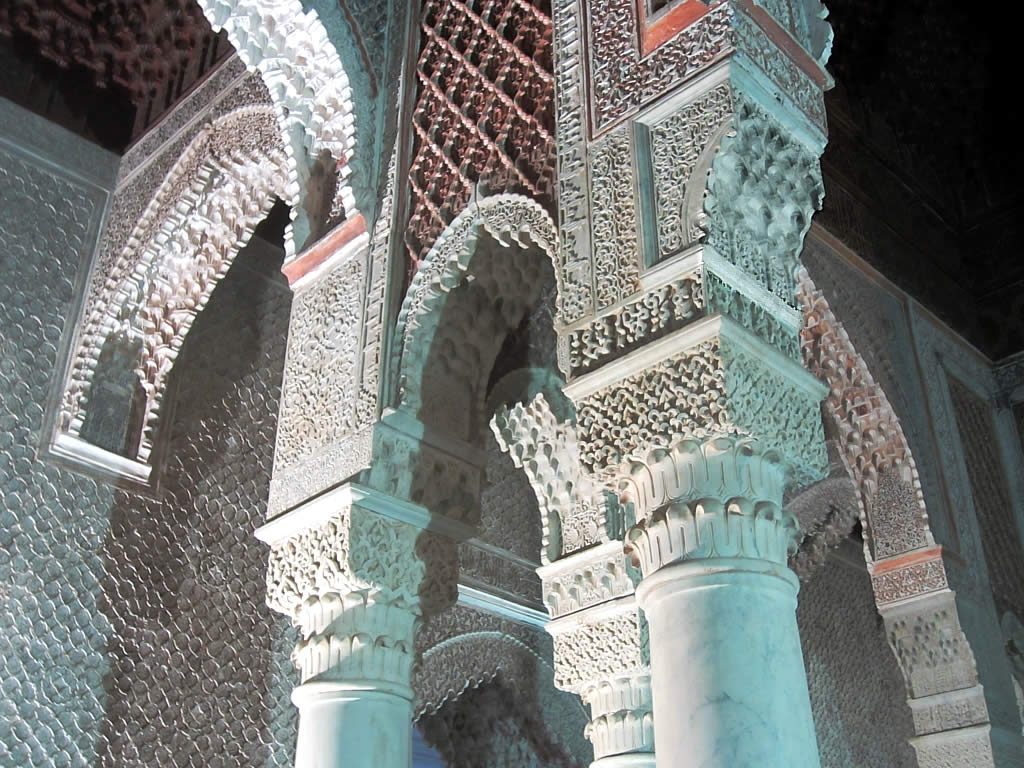
Details of the marble and stucco elements blending together in the corners of the chamber

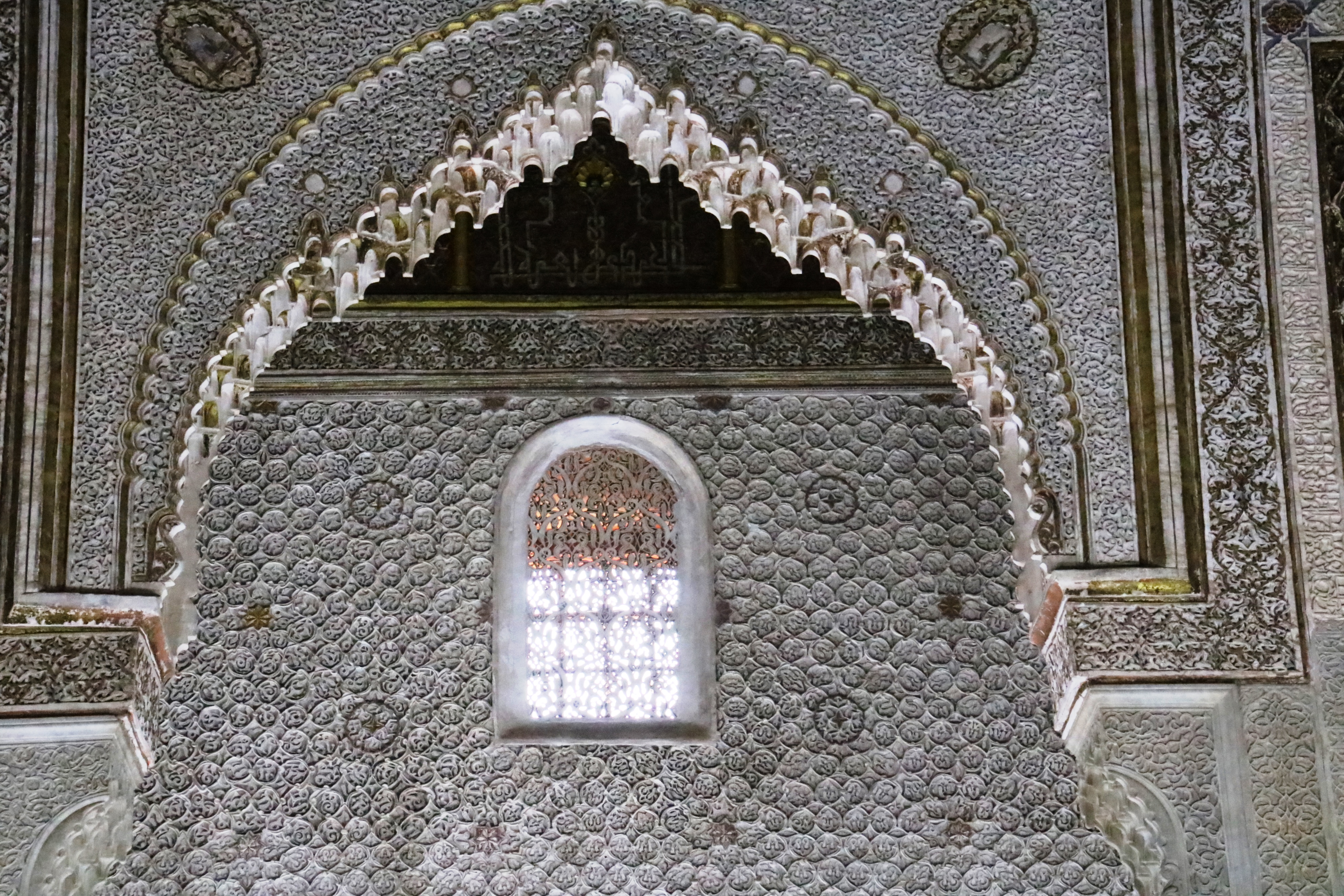
The back wall of the mausoleum chamber

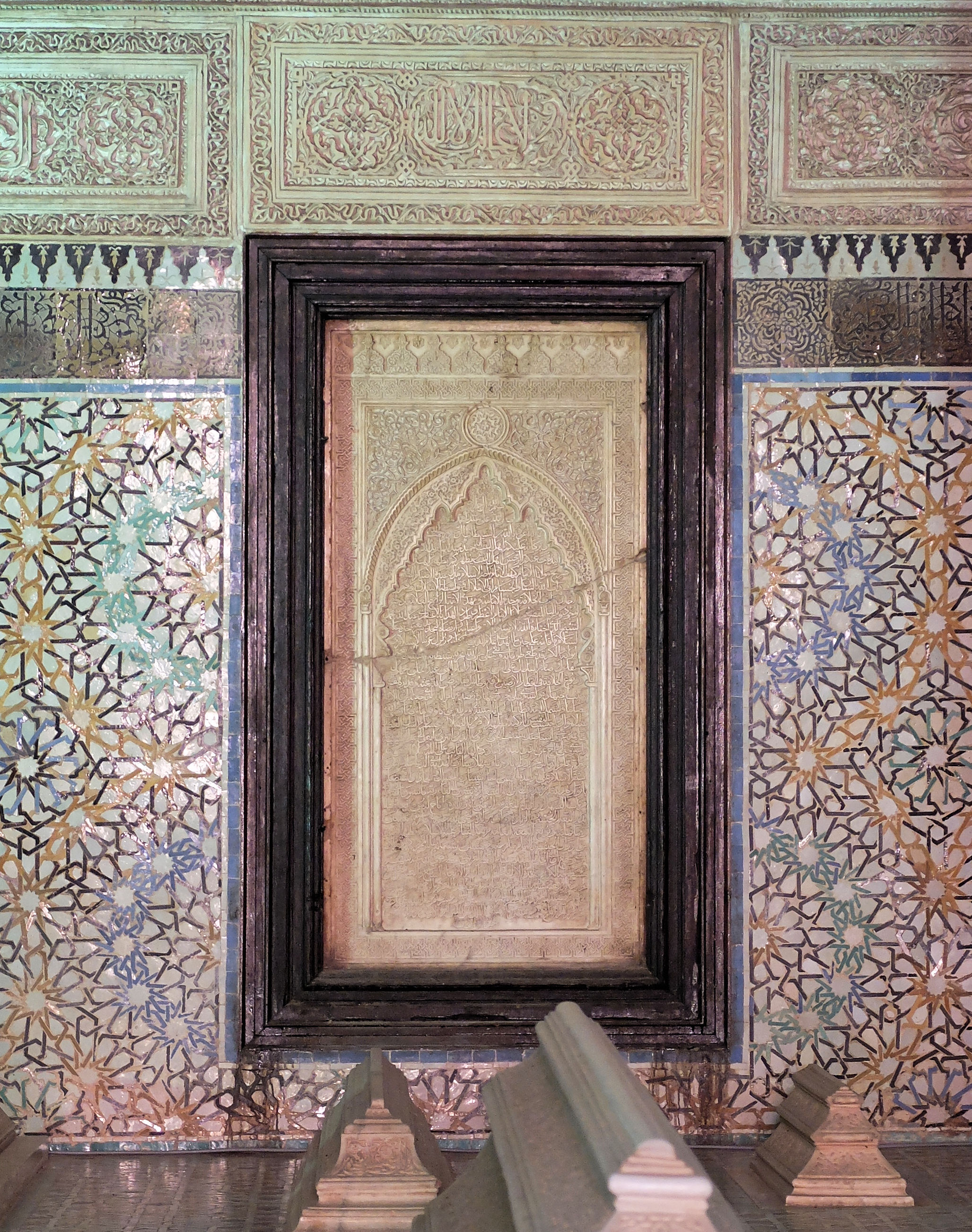
The marble inscription panel dedicated to Muhammad al-Shaykh (inexplicably moved here at an unknown date)

==== Chamber of the Three Niches ====
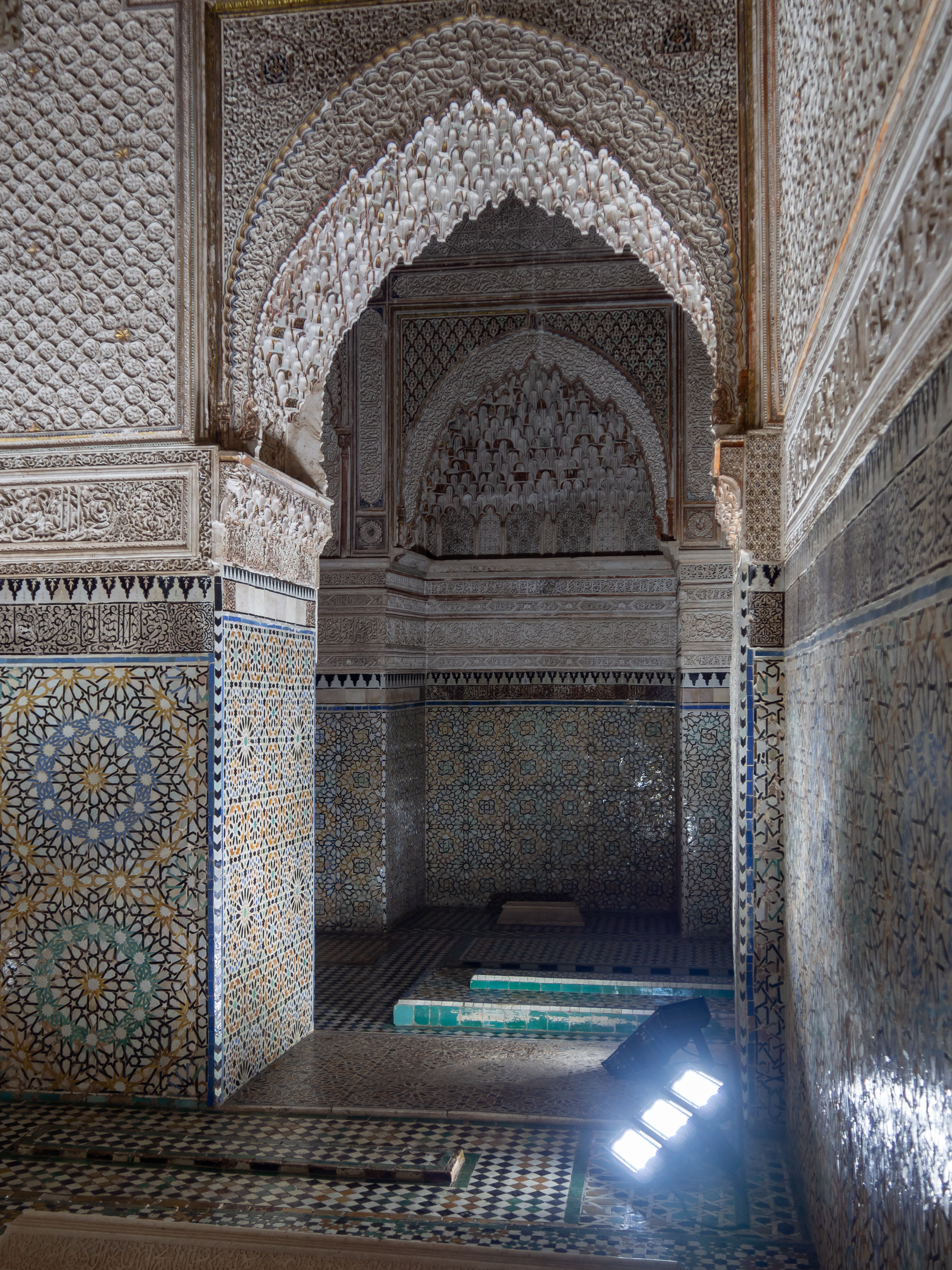
Glimpse into the Chamber of the Three Niches from the main mausoleum. (The chamber itself is not accessible to visitors today.)

The Chamber of the Three Niches is an annex to the main mausoleum chamber and houses more tombs, including an epitaph attesting to the first (temporary) burial of the Marinid sultan Abu al-Hasan in 1341 (presumably transferred here after the Saadian construction). Another marble inscription plaque, this time belonging to Moulay Abdallah al-Ghalib, is embedded in one of the walls of the chamber here. Once again, it is unknown why or when this plaque was moved from its original location (at the head of Abdallah's tomb in the eastern mausoleum) to here.

The chamber is accessed from the Chamber of the Twelve Columns via two side openings in the northern wall of the latter. The layout of the chamber is simpler and its ceilings are also less elaborate. However, its walls are covered in some of the most intricate stucco carvings of the complex, featuring a variety of arabesque, geometric, and epigraphic/calligraphic motifs.

== Notable burials ==
The following individuals are buried in the necropolis. As the necropolis contains well over a hundred graves of varying importance, this list is only partial. Some individuals are believed to be buried here due to some historical evidence, but their tombs have not always been clearly identified (noted as "unconfirmed" below).

Eastern mausoleum:

- Muhammad al-Shaykh (d. 1557): first Saadian sultan to rule a unified Morocco, after defeating the Wattasid dynasty.
- Abdallah al-Ghalib (d. 1574): second sultan, son of Muhammad al-Shaykh, fought the Ottomans in Wadi Al-Laban.
- Abd al-Malik I (unconfirmed, d. 1578): fourth sultan, son of Muhammad al-Shaykh, fought the Portuguese in the Battle of Alcácer Quibir.
- Lalla Mas'uda (d. 1591): political figure, mother of Ahmad al-Mansur.

Western mausoleum:

- Ahmad al-Mansur (d. 1603): fifth sultan, longest-reigning Saadian, son of Muhammad ash-Shaykh, defeated the Songhai Empire and expanded south forming the Pashalik of Timbuktu.
- Lalla Aisha as-Shabaniyya (d. 1623): a wife of Ahmad al-Mansur and mother of Moulay Zidan.
- Moulay Zidan (d. 1627): son of Ahmad al-Mansur, ruler of Marrakesh during most of the succession war (1603–1627).
- Abd al-Malik II (d. 1631): first ruler of unified Saadian realm after the succession war, son of Moulay Zidan.
- Muhammad al-Shaykh al-Saghir (d. 1655): longest-reigning sultan after the succession war, son of Moulay Zidan.

Chamber of the Mihrab (attached to western mausoleum):

- Moulay al-Yazid (unconfirmed, d. 1792): Nineteenth 'Alawi sultan, son of Mohammed III.

== Influence and legacy ==
Scholars generally view the design and decoration of the Saadian Tombs as strongly and clearly embedded in the artistic traditions of earlier Andalusi and Moroccan architecture (or "Hispano-Moorish" art). Some, such as Georges Marçais, even refer to Saadian art more generally as a "renaissance" of this style, before its relative decline in the following centuries. In addition to the use and continued elaboration of decorative techniques from the Marinid era of Morocco, the Saadian Tombs also suggest an influence from Nasrid antecedents in Granada, Spain. The layout of the Chamber of the Twelve Columns, for example, is similar to the layout of the rawda mausoleum in the Alhambra and was later repeated in the Mausoleum of Moulay Isma'il in Meknes during the 'Alawi period. Other Nasrid influences in Saadian architecture include the two ornamental ablutions pavilions which Ahmad al-Mansur and Abdallah al-Ghalib II added to the courtyard of the Qarawiyyin Mosque in Fes, which strongly resemble the two pavilions in the Court of the Lions at the Alhambra.

The Saadian Tombs are frequently regarded as the high benchmark of Moroccan art and architecture in the Saadian period and in the post-medieval period generally, thanks to its extremely rich decoration and its "rational" arrangement of interior space. Shortly after they were "rediscovered" and made accessible to the public by French colonial authorities in 1917, they were praised by many contemporary art historians and observers who visited them. At the same time, many (Western) scholars still view the Saadian period as the beginning of a decline or of a "conservative" period in Moroccan art and architecture, during which existing styles were faithfully reproduced and imitated but few innovations were introduced.

== See also ==
- El Badi Palace
- Shrob ou shouf fountain
