= Lambrequin arch =

Architectural element

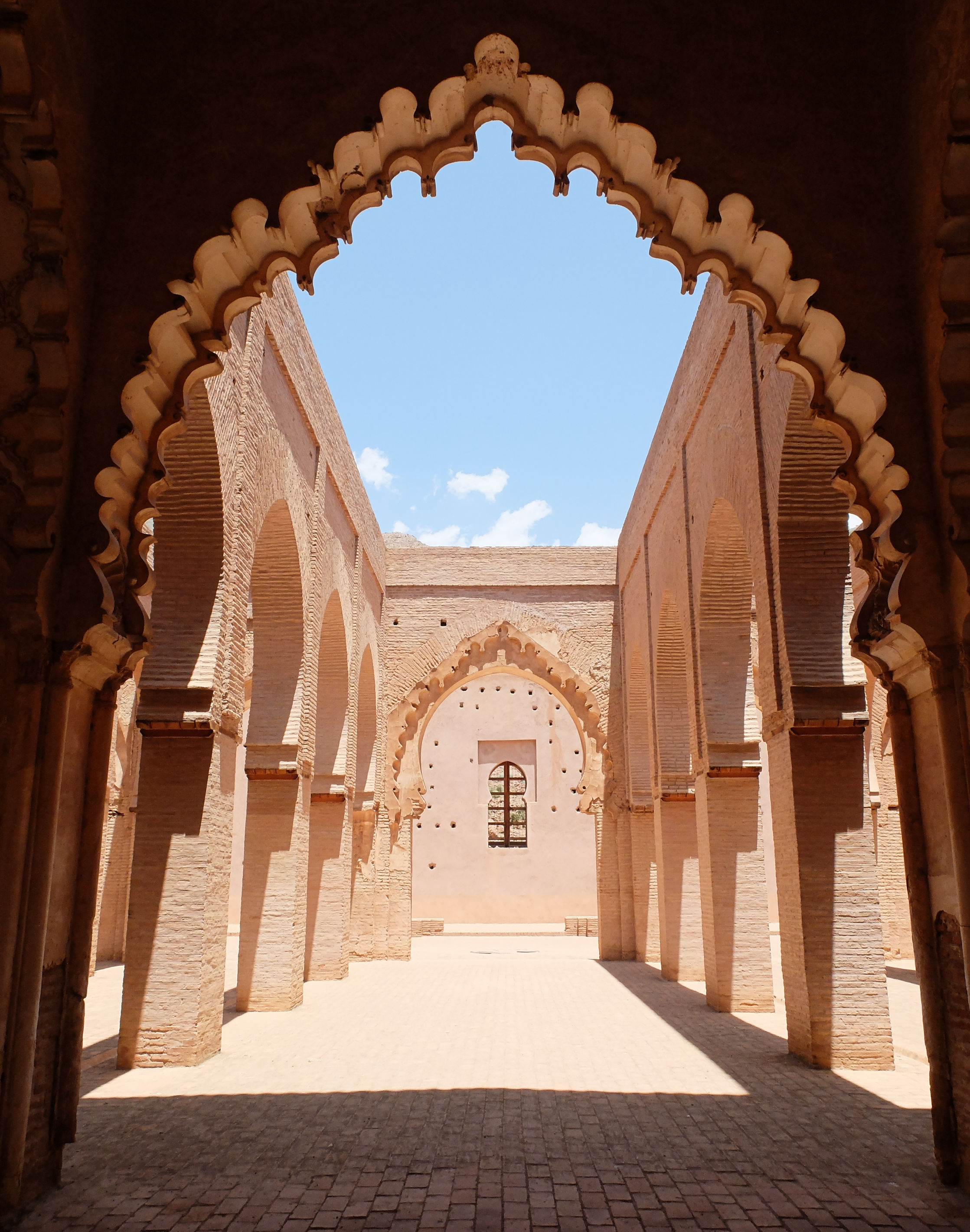
A lambrequin arch in the Mosque of Tinmal (12th century)

The lambrequin arch, is a type of arch with an ornate profile of lobes and points. It is especially characteristic of Moorish architecture in North Africa and present-day Spain. The muqarnas arch, whose intrados (inner surfaces) are made up of muqarnas (or stalactite) sculpting, also resembles the profile of the lambrequin arch and is related to it in form and perhaps in origin.

== Origins and development ==
This type of arch was introduced into the Maghreb and al-Andalus regions during the Almoravid period (11th–12th centuries), with an early appearance in the funerary section of the Qarawiyyin Mosque (in Fez) dating from the early 12th century. Examples of this form are also found in the Almoravid-era decoration of the Great Mosque of Tlemcen (founded in 1082, redecorated in 1136). Its use is particularly characteristic of the Maghreb and it grew in importance during the following Almohad period.

At least two different origins have been suggested for the lambrequin arch. Scholar François-Auguste de Montêquin states that it is a more elaborate derivation of the mixtilinear arches that appeared in the architecture of the Taifa period in al-Andalus (11th century), as seen in the prayer room of the Aljaferia Palace in Zaragoza. It was also common in subsequent Almoravid architecture, as seen around the mihrab of the Great Mosque of Tlemcen. Art historian Jonathan Bloom also describes the lambrequin arch as an elaboration of the Almoravid mixtilinear arch.

Architectural historian Georges Marçais states that the lambrequin arch might have been derived from muqarnas, a three-dimensional geometric sculpting often nicknamed "stalactites", which was used in corbeling and arches. Jonathan Bloom also notes a visual relation between the lambrequin arch and muqarnas, with the lambrequin arch profile resembling a two-dimensional reduction of a muqarnas vault. Architecture professor Friedrich Ragette refers to the lambrequin arches of the Tinmal and Qarawiyyin mosques as "muqarnas arches". Some lambrequin arches also feature muqarnas sculpting on the intrados of the arch; for example, in the arches near the mihrab of the Kutubiyya Mosque in Marrakesh, the arch before the mihrab in the Great Mosque of Fes el-Jdid, and the arches in the Saadian Tombs in Marrakesh.

The lambrequin arch remained common in the subsequent architecture of the region, in many cases used to emphasize the maqsura, or the space near the mihrab area of a mosque. Muqarnas arches are also found in the Alhambra palaces in Granada, particularly in the Court of Lions. De Montêquin refers to a variant of multifoil arch in the Alhambra with muqarnas or lambrequin profiles as the "Nasrid arch". Lambrequin arches also appear in Mudéjar architecture of this era. Both lambrequin and related mixtilinear arches continued to appear in later Spanish architecture in both Spain and Latin America, including in the Baroque architecture of these regions from the 18th century.

== Gallery ==
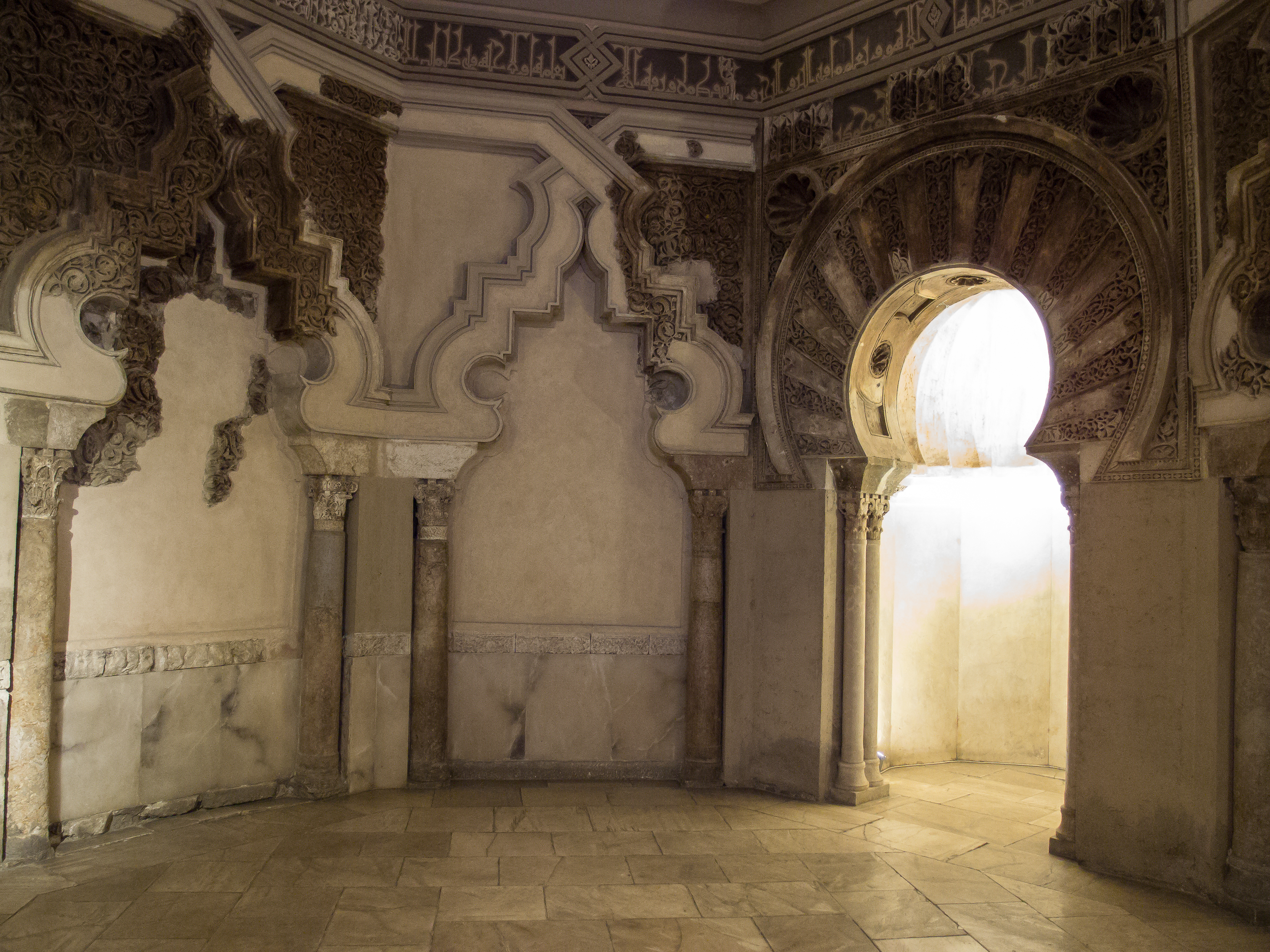
Example of mixtilinear arches (left and center) in the Aljaferia of Zaragoza (11th century, Taifa period)

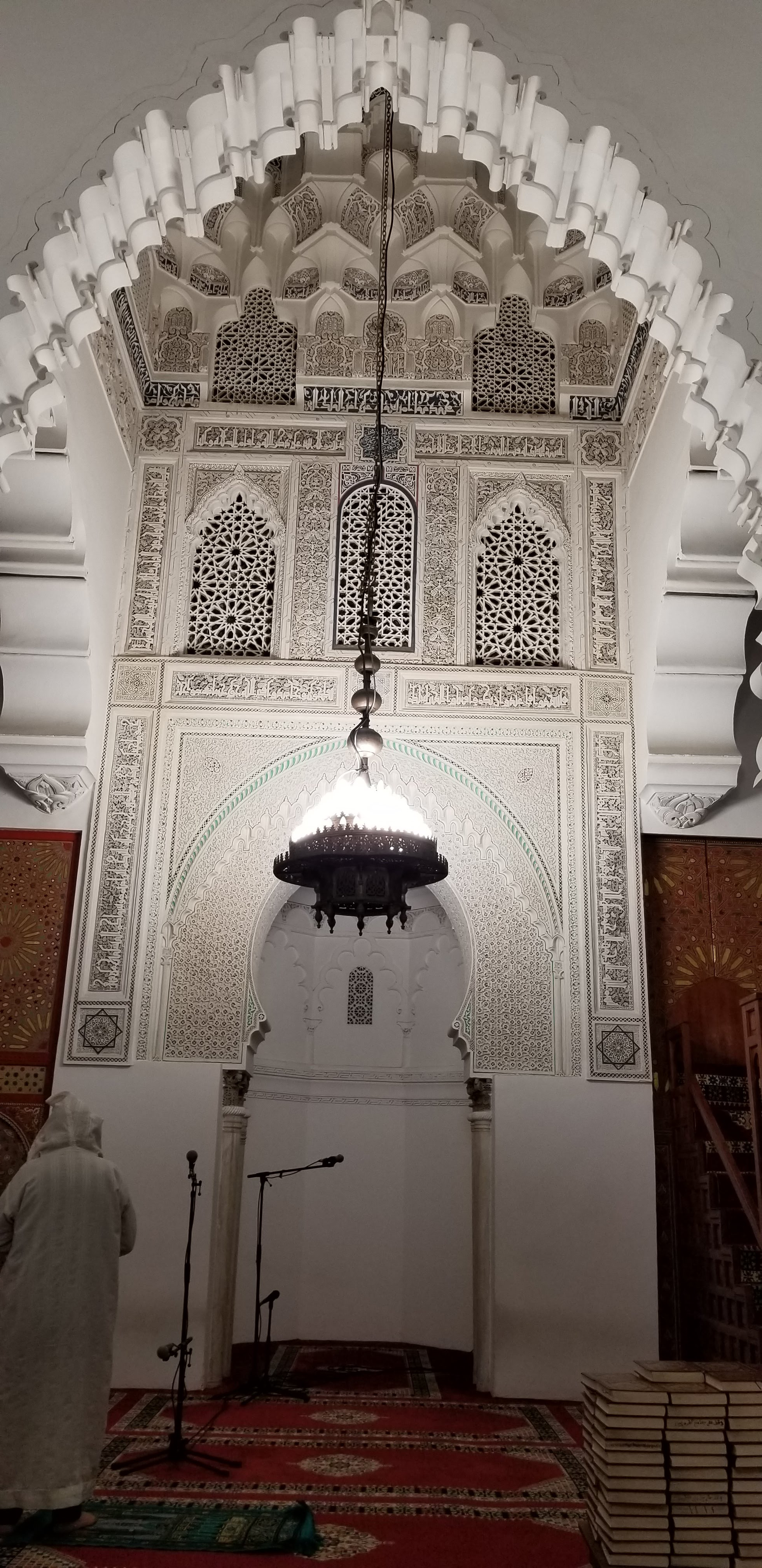
Lambrequin arches around the mihrab of the Qarawiyyin Mosque in Fes, from the Almoravid period (early 12th century)

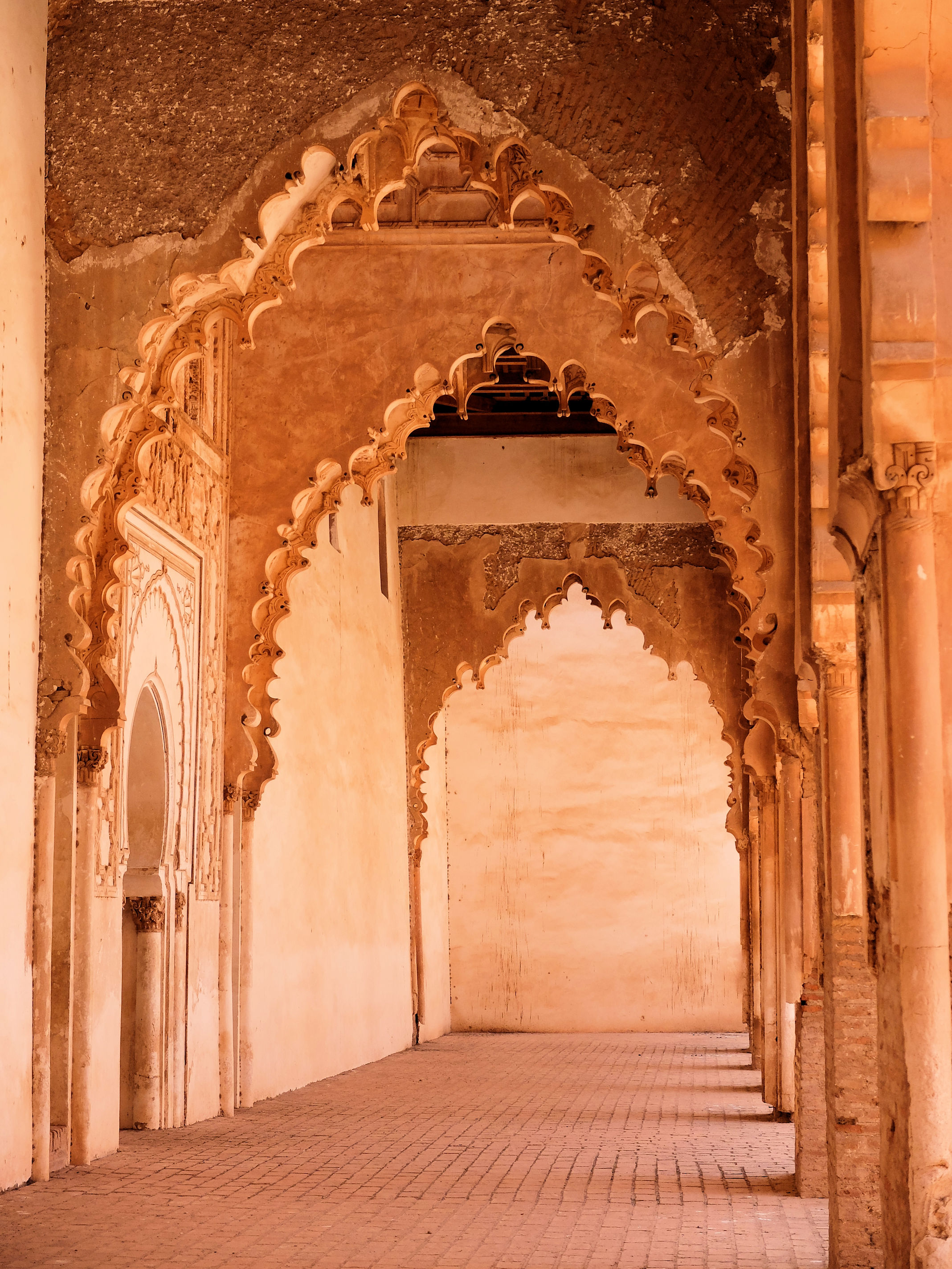
Lambrequin arches in the qibla aisle of the Tinmal Mosque (mid-12th century, Almohad period)

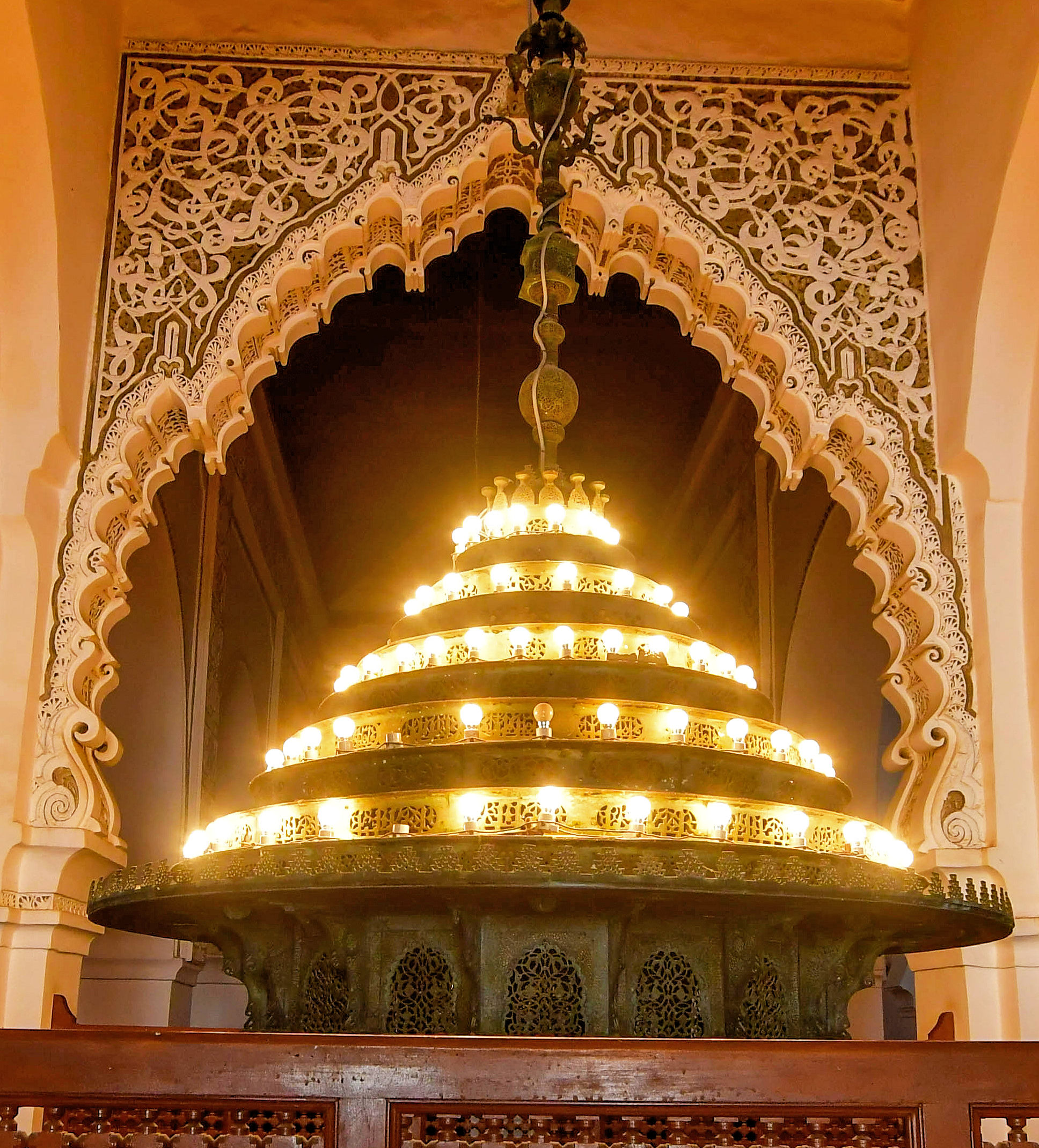
Lambrequin arch in the Great Mosque of Taza (Almohad period, with Marinid decoration)

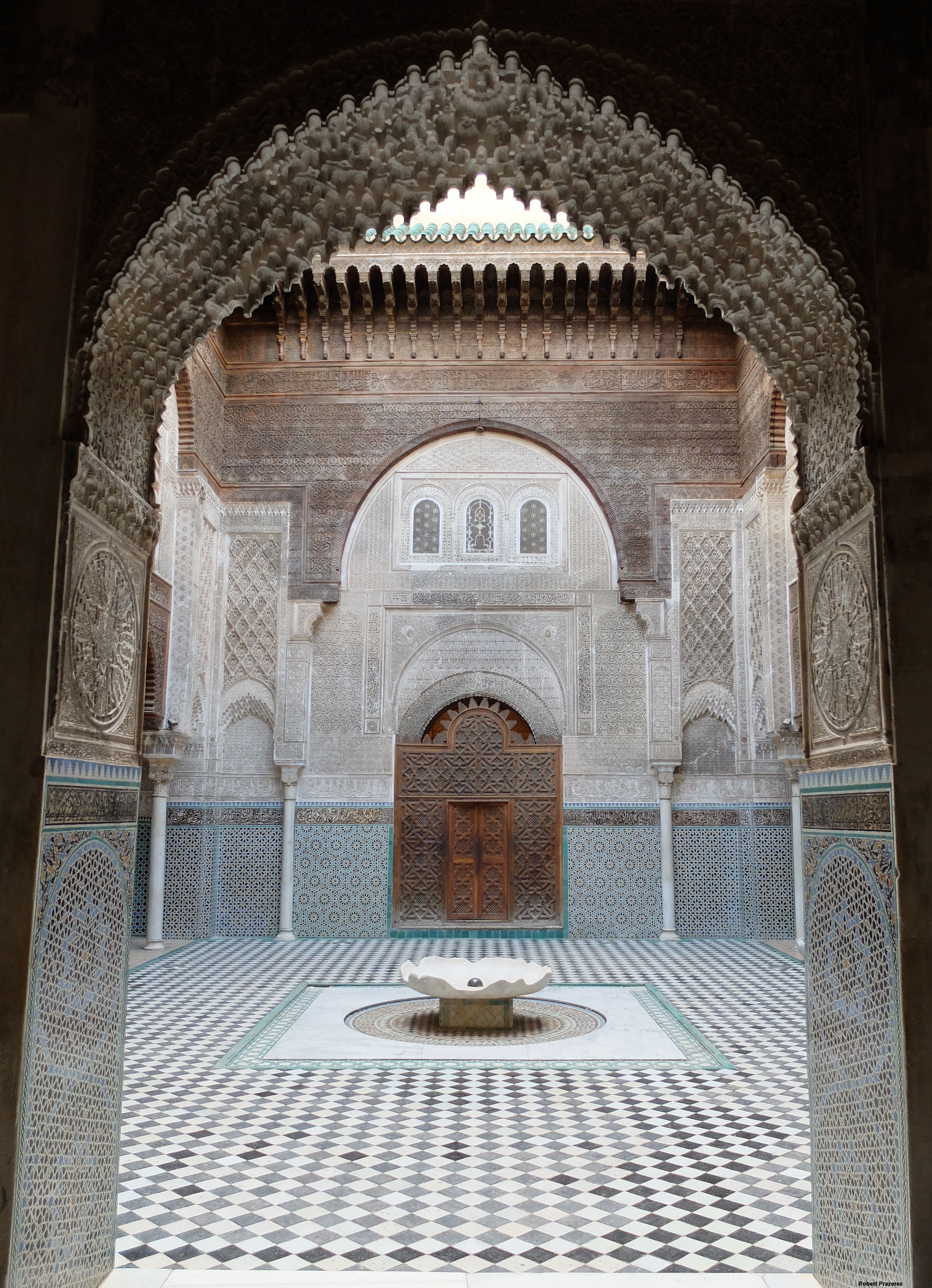
A muqarnas arch in the Madrasa al-Attarine, Fes (1323–1325, Marinid period)

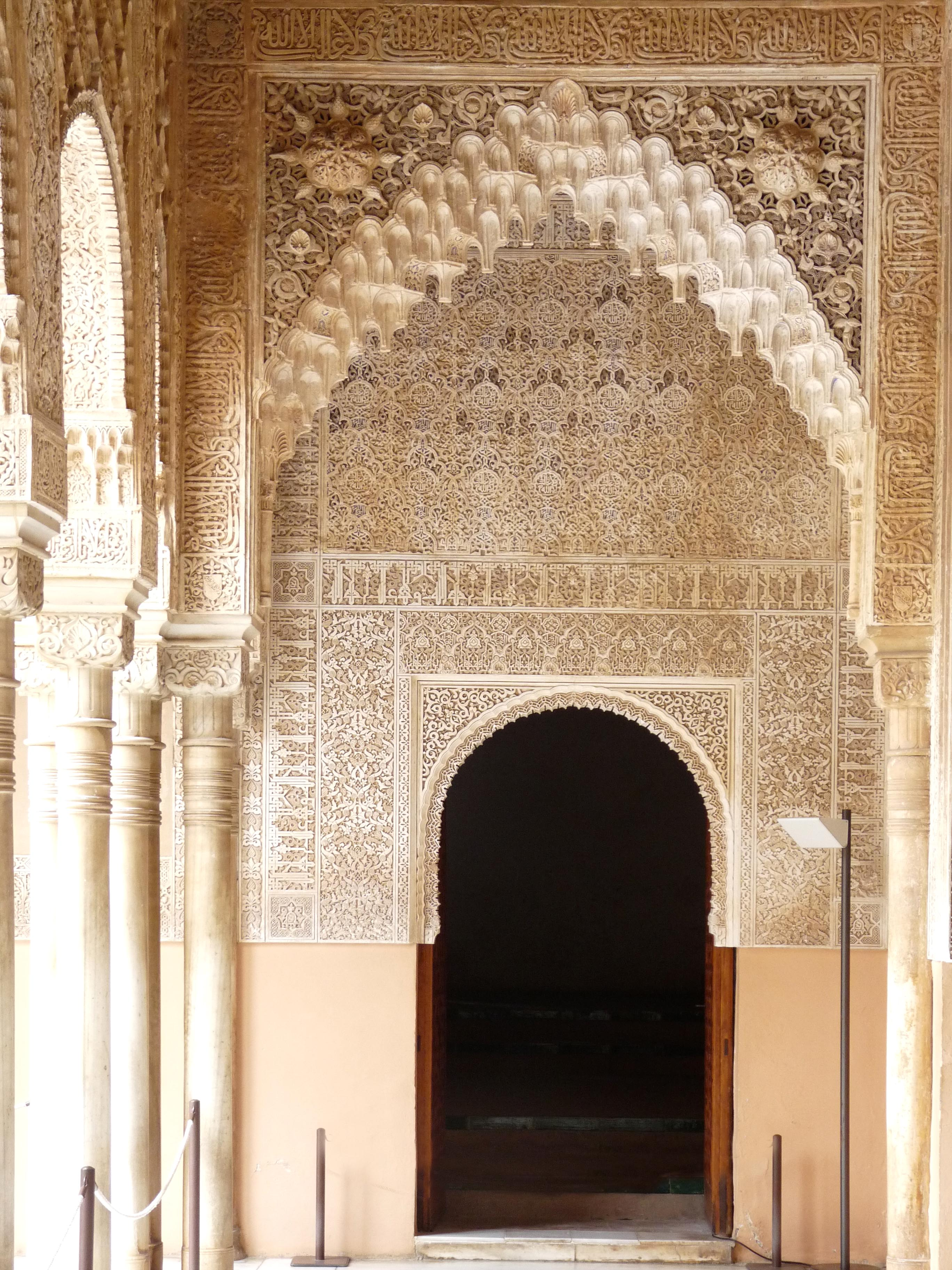
A muqarnas arch or "Nasrid arch" (top) in the gallery of the Courtyard of the Lions in the Alhambra, Granada (14th century, Nasrid period)

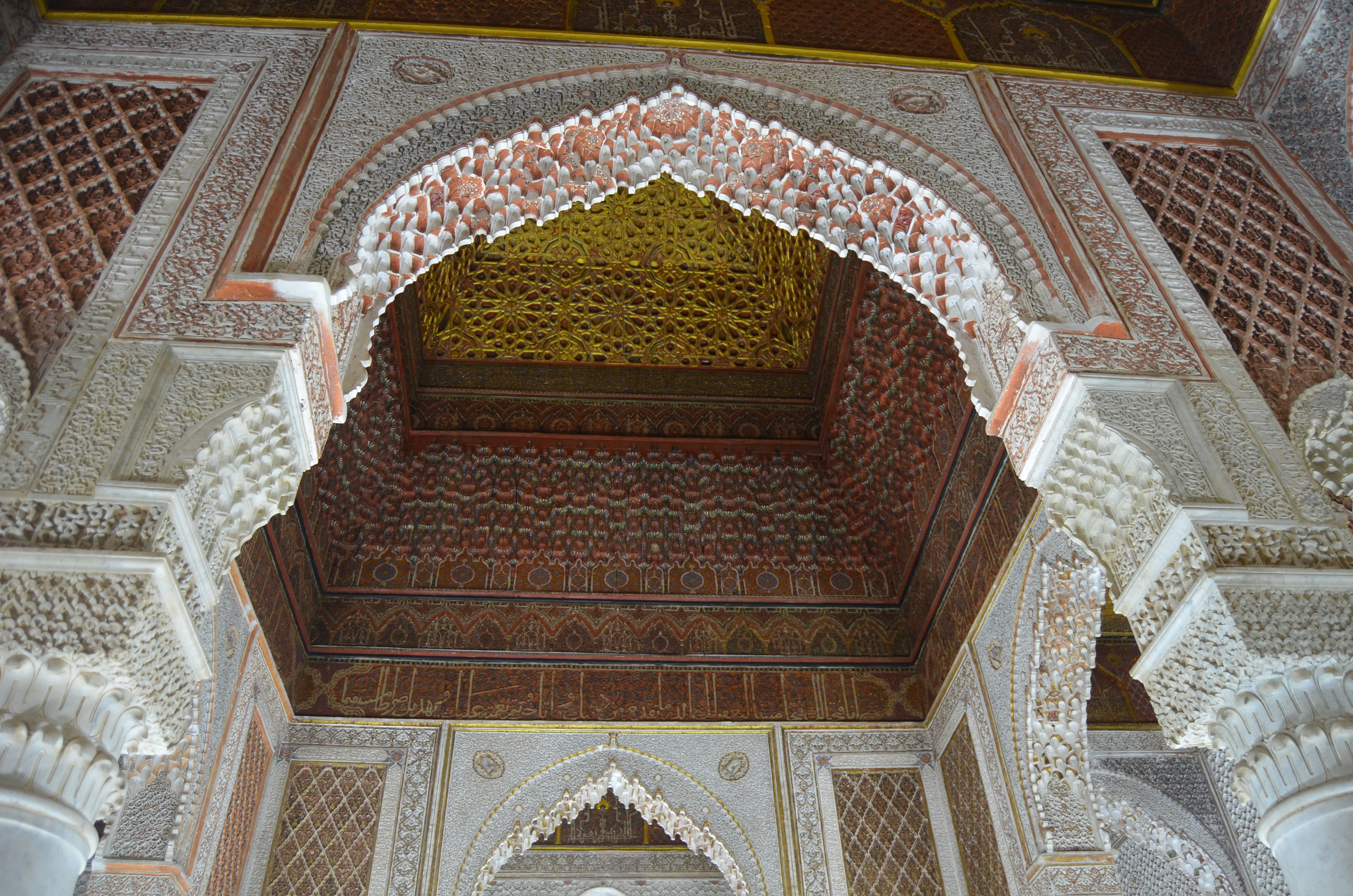
Lambrequin arch with muqarnas intrados in the Saadian Tombs, Marrakesh (16th century, Saadi period)

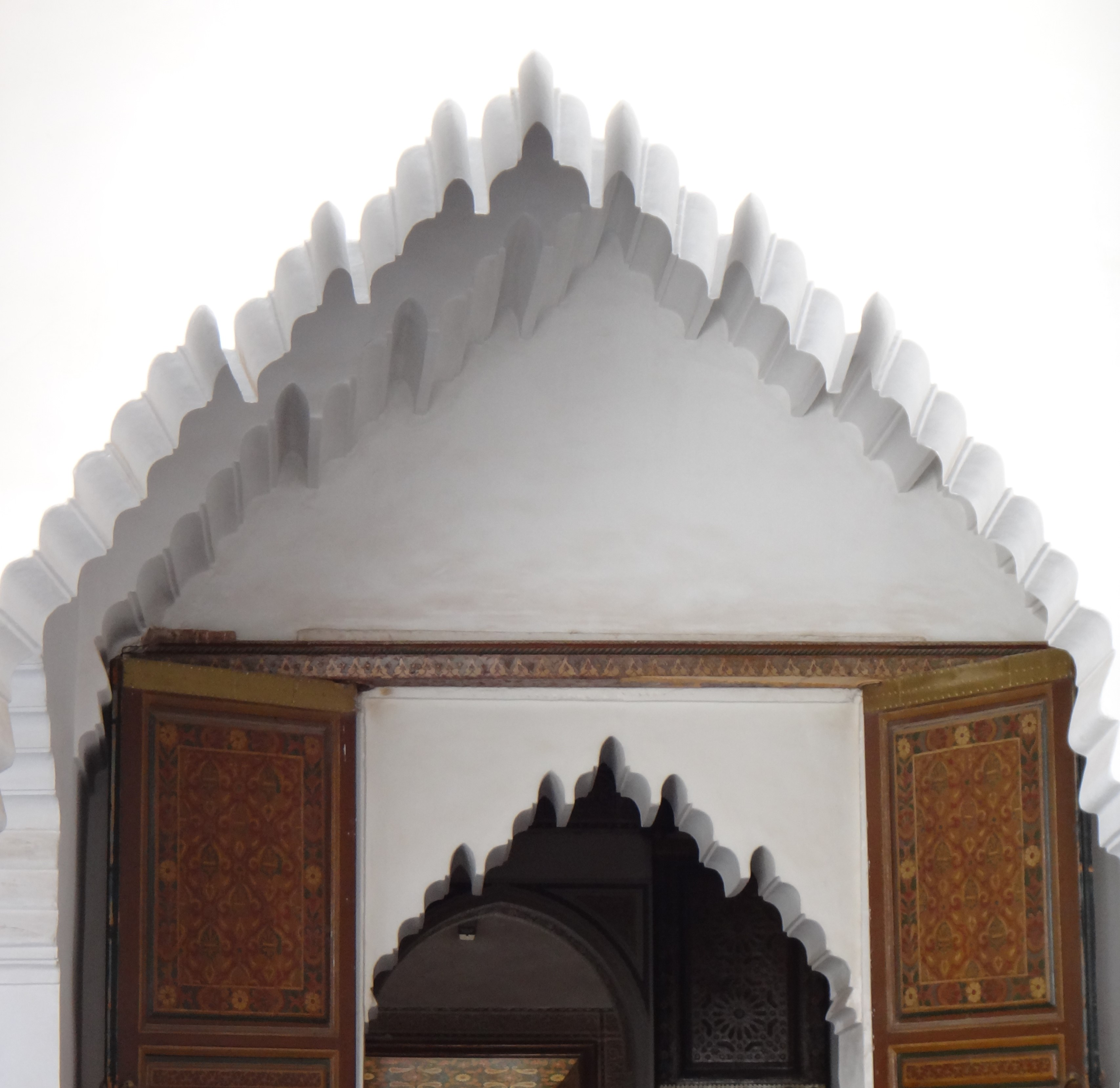
Lambrequin arches in the Bahia Palace in Marrakesh, Morocco (late 19th century or early 20th century, Alawi period)

== See also ==
- Horseshoe arch
- Multifoil arch
