= Mixtilinear arch =

Decorative architectural element

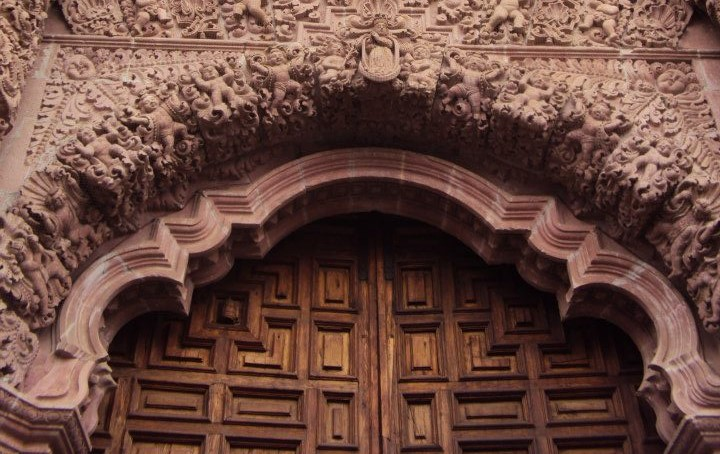
Mixtilinear arch at the Cathedral Basilica of Zacatecas, Mexico

The mixtilinear arch (also mixed-line arch) is a decorative (non-structural) arch with intrados consisting of rounded and straight segments connected at angles, its outline sometimes resembling a shaped gable.

== History ==
The idea of this silhouette came into Moorish architecture of the Taifa period probably from the earlier interlaced arches. Such arches were traditionally used in an arcade, although the types might vary from one building to another. The architects of the Great Mosque of Córdoba, at the end of 10th century AD, broke the tradition by mixing horseshoe arches and multifoil arches at the Villaviciosa Chapel. The creators of the Taifa mixtilinear arch were inspired by this arrangement and similar ones at Mosque of Cristo de la Luz in Toledo, producing early designs at the Aljafería palace in Zaragoza.

The mixed-line arch was popular during the Almoravid period, when an "ultra-baroque" modification, a lambrequin arch, was also created. These forms also continued to be used in the later architecture of Spain and of Latin America, including in Baroque buildings of the 18th century.

== Gallery ==
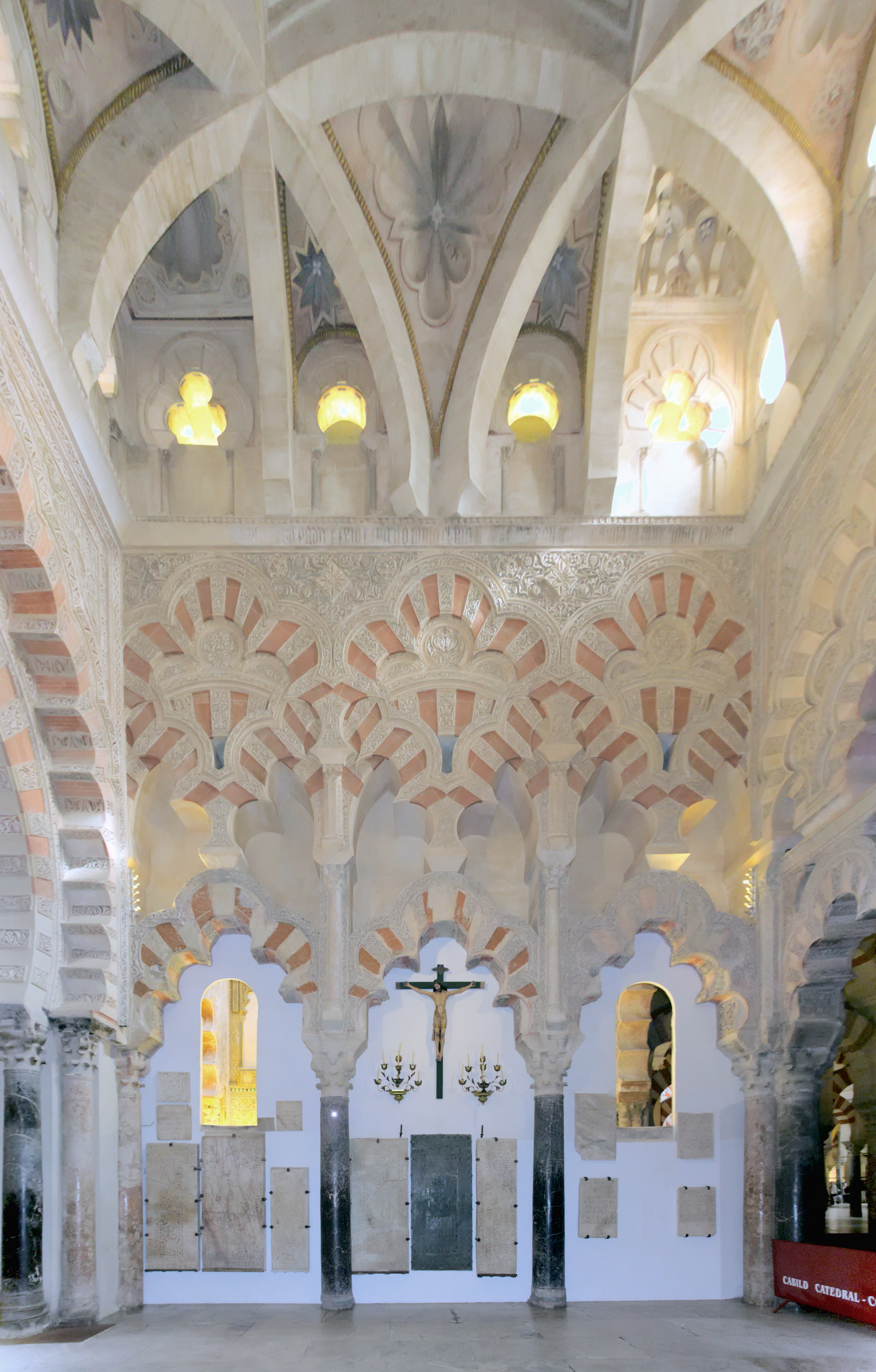
Interlaced arches at Villaviciosa Chapel

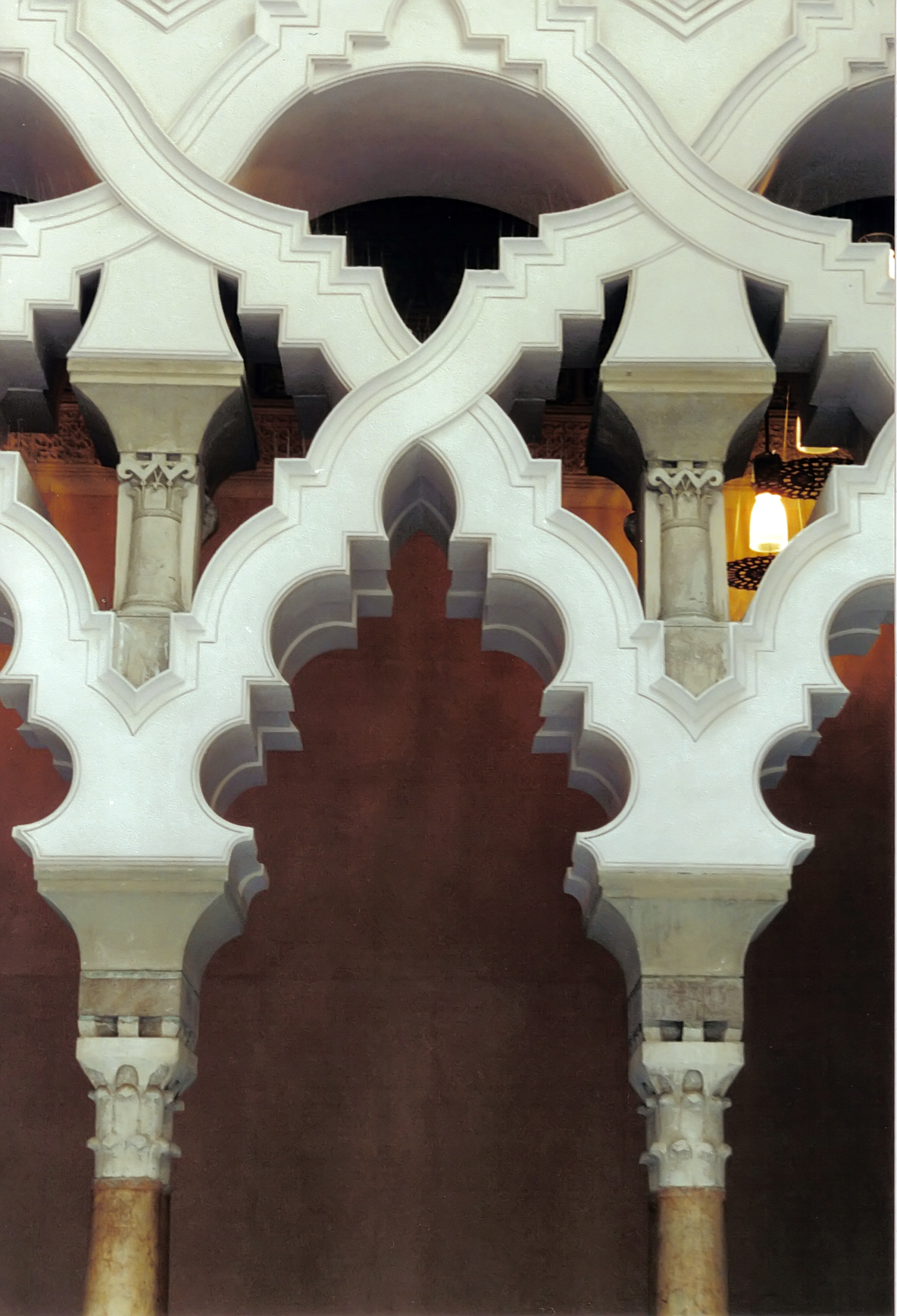
Intersecting mixtilinear arches at Aljaferia

== Sources ==
- Montéquin, François-Auguste De (1991). "Arches in the Architecture of Muslim Spain : Typology and Evolution". Islamic Studies. 30 (1/2). Islamic Research Institute, International Islamic University, Islamabad: 67–82. ISSN 0578-8072. JSTOR 20840025.
- Woodman, Francis; Bloom, Jonathan M. (2003). "Arch". Oxford Art Online. Oxford University Press. doi:10.1093/gao/9781884446054.article.t003657. ISBN 978-1-884446-05-4.
