= Interlaced arch =

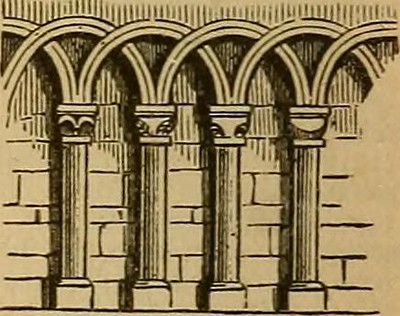

Interlaced arches is a scheme of decoration employed in Islamic and later in Romanesque and Gothic architecture, where arches spring from alternate piers, interlacing or intersecting one another. In the former case, the first arch archivolt is carried alternately over and under the second, in the latter the archivolts actually intersect and stop one another. An example of the former exists in St Peter-in-the-East in Oxford and of the latter in St. Joseph’s chapel in Glastonbury, and in the Bristol Cathedral. The arches in the interlacing arcade can be either semicircular or pointed, and usually form purely decorative blind arcades.

The interlaced arches are most likely an invention of Islamic architecture (cf. Bab al-Mardum Mosque, 999-1000 AD and Mosque–Cathedral of Córdoba, 833-988). This decoration was especially popular in England, with the most famous example at Lincoln Cathedral (St Hugh's choir).

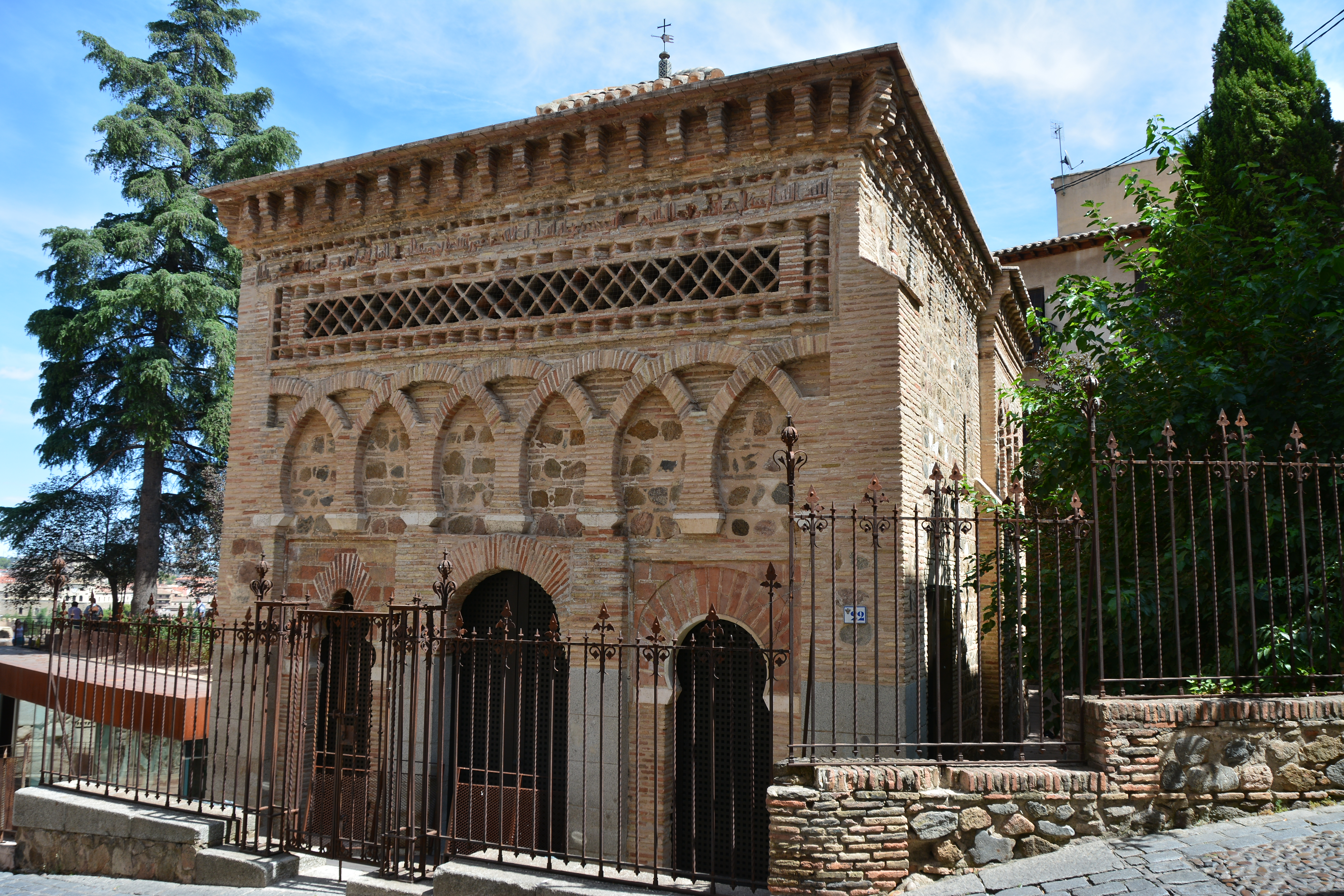
Bab al-Mardum Mosque

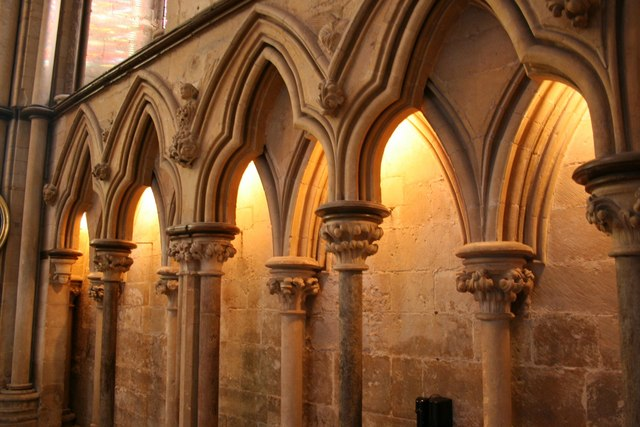
Arcade at St Hugh's choir of Lincoln Cathedral

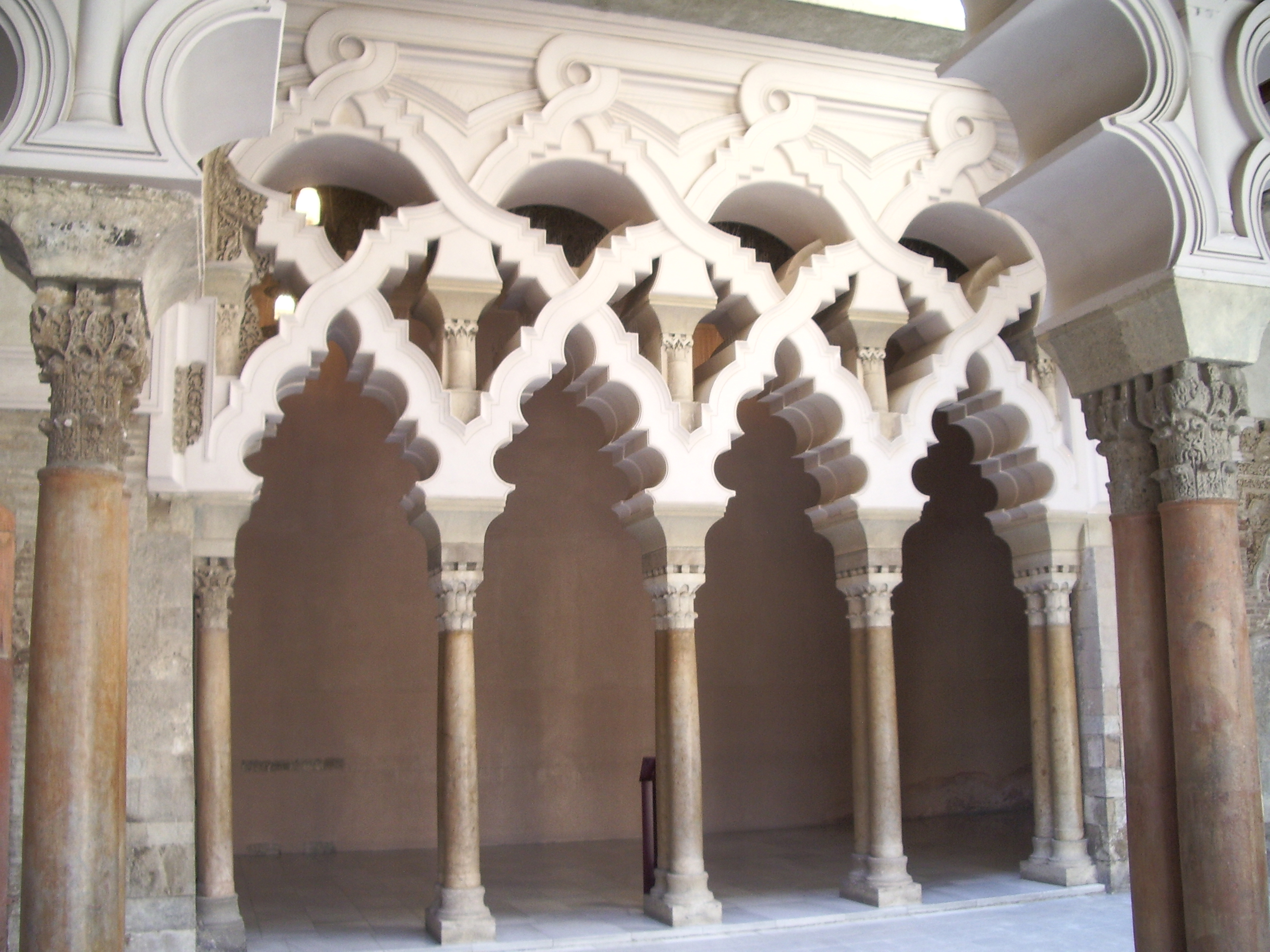
Non-blind mixed-line arches at Aljafería Palace

== Sources ==
- Hourihane, C. (2012). "Arch". The Grove Encyclopedia of Medieval Art and Architecture. Vol. 1. Oxford University Press. pp. 129–134. ISBN 978-0-19-539536-5.
- Moffett, M.; Fazio, M.W.; Wodehouse, L. (2003). "Islamic Architecture". A World History of Architecture. Monographics (Series : Laurence King Publishing). Laurence King. ISBN 978-1-85669-371-4.
