= Nfiss =

River in Morocco

Coordinates: 31°43′N 8°21′W

Nfiss Oued Nfiss, Oued N'Fis
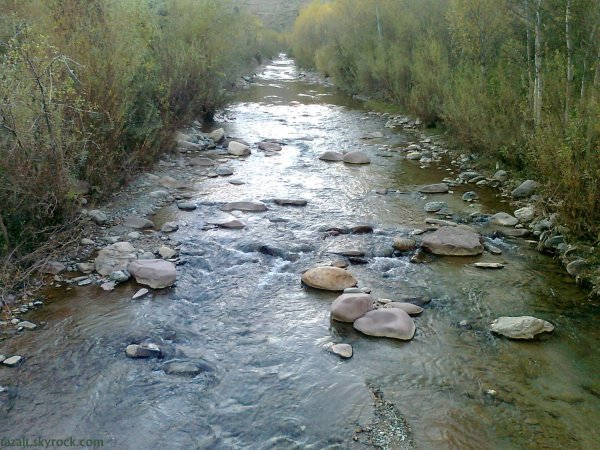
- The Nfiss near the village of Tazalt

Location
- Country: Morocco

Physical characteristics
- Source
  - location: Eastern slope of Jbel Tichka, High Atlas
  - elevation: c. 2900 m
- Mouth
  - location: Approximately 25 km west of Marrakesh into the Tensift
  - elevation: 400 m
- Length: 183 km (114 mi)
- Basin size: 2,855 km^{2} (1,102 sq mi)
- Discharge
  - location: I.E. Hammam

Basin features
- Tributaries
  - left: Oued Anougal

The Nfiss (Arabic: نفيس, French: Oued N'Fis, also referred to as Wād Nafīs in older literature) is one of the most important tributaries of the Tensift in southwestern Morocco. Its length is approximately 183 km.

== Geography ==
The Nfiss rises at an elevation of about 2,900 m (9,500 ft) on the eastern flank of the 3,350 m-high Jbel Tichka in the High Atlas. It initially flows eastward toward the Tizi n'Tichka Pass before turning north and finally emptying into the Tensift approximately 25 km west of Marrakesh.

== Hydrology ==
The discharge of the Nfiss was measured at the I.E. Hammam gauging station (1966–1998) in m³/s.

== Uses ==
The Nfiss, together with its two reservoirs and several other barrages, primarily supplies drinking and irrigation water to the city of Marrakesh and surrounding settlements. Along its often steep upper banks, the local Berber population practices limited arable farming; livestock husbandry (sheep and goats) plays a significantly more important role.

== Dams ==
There are two larger reservoirs on the Nfiss:

- Lalla Takerkoust Dam (about 40 km south of Marrakesh)
- Yacoub El Mansour Dam (about 60 km south of Marrakesh near Ouirgane)

== History ==
In the late 19th and early 20th centuries, the Nfiss Valley was largely controlled by the Berber Goundafa tribe, who built several fortified granaries (kasbahs), including the Agadir n'Gouf near Ijoukak.

== Settlements on the river ==
- Tinmal
- Ijoukak
- Ouirgane
- Lalla Takerkoust

== Points of interest ==
- The mountain landscape of the upper Nfiss offers many scenic attractions. From Ijoukak, day hikes or multi-day trekking tours are possible; the Agadir n'Gouf stands on a hilltop above the village.
- The small Berber mountain village of Tinmal, about 6 km to the southwest, is home to an Almohad mosque that is open to non-Muslim visitors. It can be reached on foot (about 1 km) from the R203 road via a frequently damaged bridge or footbridge.
