= Tizi-n-Test pass =

Mountain pass in Morocco

Coordinates: 30°50′40″N 8°22′40″W

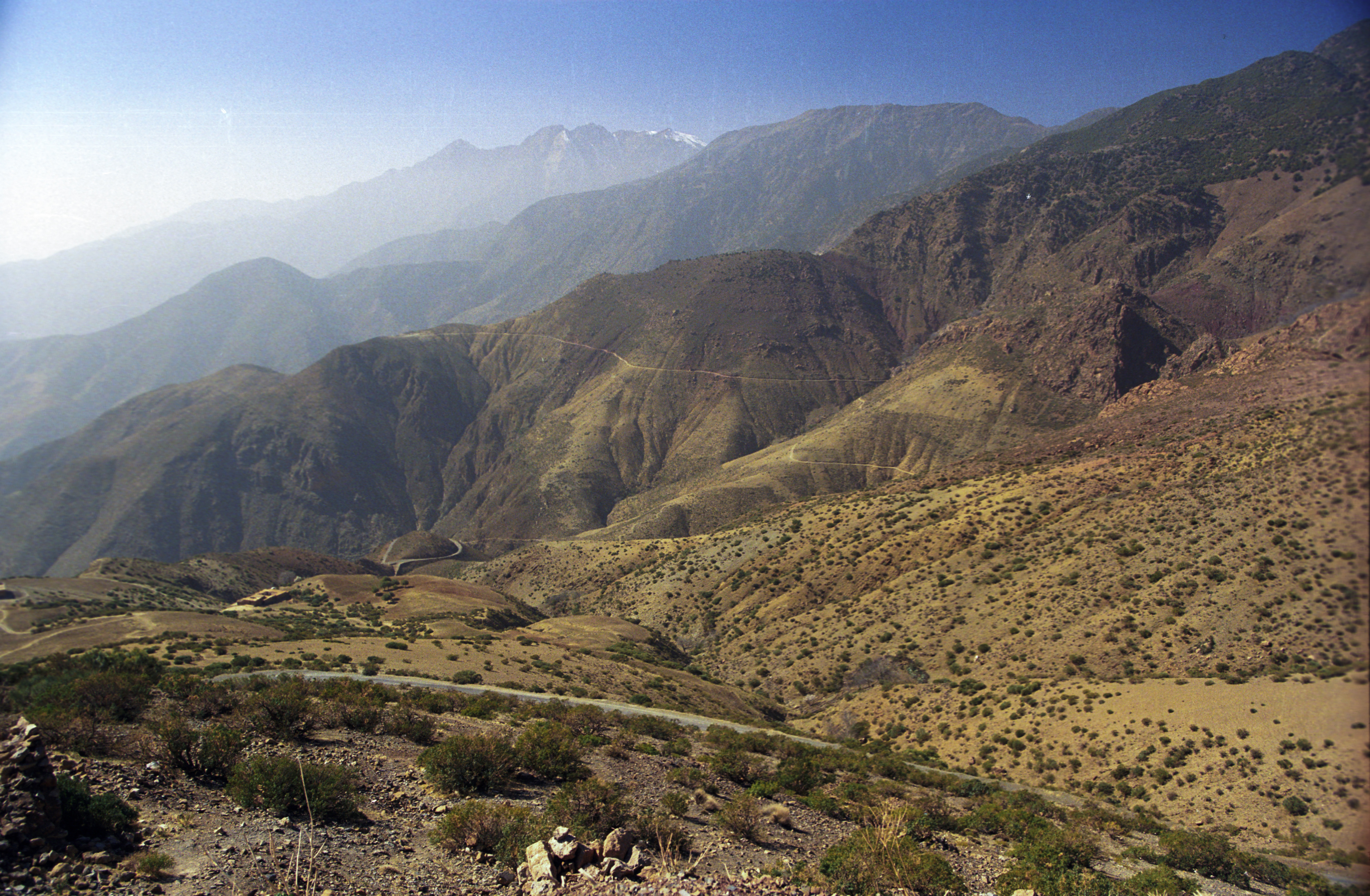

Tizi-n-Test is a small pass in the High Atlas mountains. A road crosses the pass, connecting Marrakesh and Taroudant. The pass is at 2,093 metres (6,867 ft), where a commemorative plaque certifies that the road was laid between 1926 and 1932.

The road connects Asni, Ouirgane, Talaat-n-Yacoub and Tin-Mal. The road is particularly challenging on the 1,600 m descent from the high pass to Taroudant.

The fertile valley between Ouirgane and the pass is watered by the Nfiss River. It is the traditional land of the Goundafas, one of several Berber tribes who struggled for control of the High Atlas in the 19th century. In 1906, the rival Glaoui tribe attacked the Nfiss valley and burned the Kasbah of Talaat-n-Yacoub. As a result, the Goundafa built the castle of Agadir-n-Gouf, a few kilometres outside Tin-Mal, in 1907. In 1912, France, which colonised Morocco, made political bargains with the Berber rulers: The Glaoui leader was created Pacha of Marrakesh, while the Goundafa remained in control of the High Atlas. After capturing Taroudant in 1913, the Goundafa leader was acknowledged as the effective ruler of the south.
