= Ahmad Ibn al-Qadi =

Moroccan polygraph

Ahmad bin al-Qadi أحمد بن القاضي
- Born: 1553; Meknes, Morocco
- Died: 1616 (aged 62–63); Fes, Morocco

For the Egyptian encyclopedist see Shihab al-Din abu 'l-Abbas Ahmad ben Ali ben Ahmad Abd Allah al-Qalqashandi.

Shihab al-Din abu l-‘Abbas Ahmad ibn Muhammad ibn Muhammad ibn Ahmad ibn Ali ibn 'Abd ar-Rahman ibn Abi'l-'Afiyya al-Miknasi az-Zanati (Arabic: ابن القاضي المكناسي), known simply as Ahmad ibn al-Qadi or Ibn al-Qadi (1552/1553–1616), was a Moroccan polygraph. He was the leading writer from Ahmad al-Mansur's court in Morocco next to Abd al-Aziz al-Fishtali.

== Biography ==
Ahmad ibn al-Qadi was born in Fez in 1552/1553. His family was called the Ibn al-Qadi, a Berber family that belonged to the Miknasa tribe, a tribe of the Zenata confederation. Their ancestor was the Miknasi tribal chief, Musa ibn Abi al-Afiya. Several members of this family were established in Fez and Meknes. The Ibn al-qadi family gave birth to distinguished people, who, during the previous centuries, had held high political or religious offices and had become famous as islamic scholars.

== Works ==
A number of Ibn al-Qadi's scholarly works survive, including two collections of biographies of great documentary value:

- Al-Muntaqa al-maqsur 'ala ma'athir al-khilafat Abi al-Abbas al-Mansur; his primary work, a panegyric of al-Mansur's great character that qualify him the rightful caliph of Islam.
- Jadwat al Iqtibas Fi-man halla min al'alam madinata fas ('The Torch of learning in the recollection of the most influential notables of the city of Fez')
- Dhīl wafayāt al-'ayān al-musamā<<Durrat al-hidjāl fī asmā’ al-ridjāl>> (ذيل وفيات الأعيان المسمى «درة الحجال فى أسماء الرجال») Appendix to obituaries of the notable names.

== Sources ==
- Hajji, M. (1988). Al-Zawiya al-Dila'iyya [The Zaouia of Dila] (in Arabic) (2nd ed.). Rabat.
- El Hatimi, Mohammed (2004). "al-Qadi (-ibn) Ahmad ibn Muhammad (historian)". In Toufiq, Ahmed (ed.). Ma'lamat al-Maghrib (Encyclopedia of Morocco) (in Arabic). Vol. 19. al-Jamī‘a al-Maghribiyya li-l-Ta’līf wa-l-Tarjama wa-l-Nashr.
- Lévi-Provençal, Évariste (1922). Larose, Emile (ed.). Les historiens des Chorfa: essai sur la littérature historique et biographique au Maroc du XVIe au XXe siècle (in French). Paris: Émile Larose.
- Mrini, Najat (2004). "Ibn al-Qadi, Ahmad ibn Muhammad ibn Abi al-Afiya (writer)". In Toufiq, Ahmed (ed.). Ma'lamat al-Maghrib (Encyclopedia of Morocco) (in Arabic). Vol. 19. al-Jamī‘a al-Maghribiyya li-l-Ta’līf wa-l-Tarjama wa-l-Nashr.
