= Yacoub el Mansour Dam =

Dam in Ouirgane, Morocco

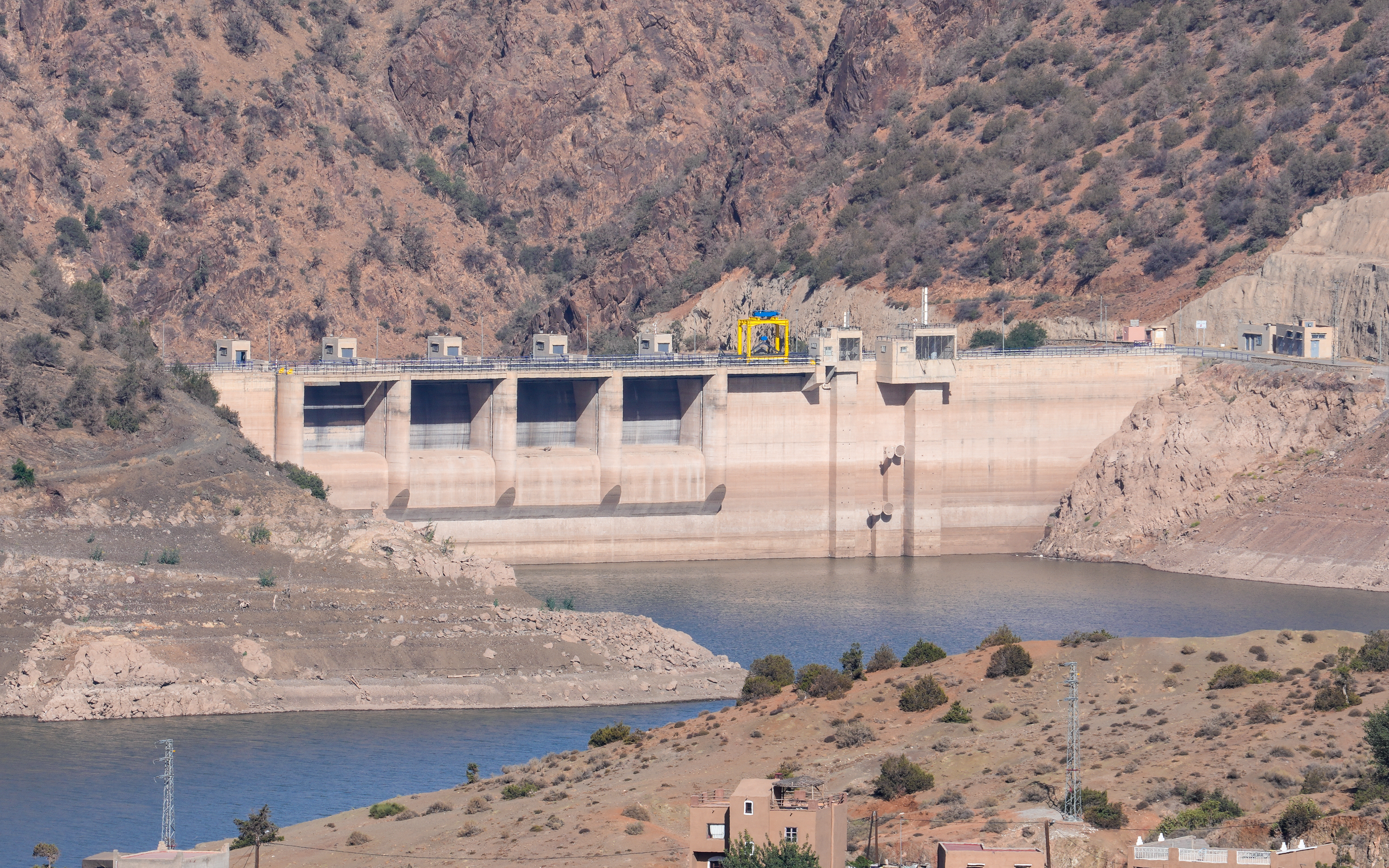
- Upstream face and crest of the dam
- Interactive map of Yacoub el Mansour Dam
- Official name: Barrage Yacoub el Mansour
- Country: Morocco
- Location: Ouirgane
- Coordinates: 31°11′23.65″N 08°05′17.64″W
- Status: Operational
- Opening date: 2008
- Owner: Office National de L'Electricite (ONE)

Dam and spillways
- Type of dam: BCR (bulked concrete rubble)
- Impounds: N'fis River
- Height: 70 m (230 ft)
- Length: 233 m (764 ft)
- Dam volume: 330,000 m^{3} (12,000,000 cu ft)

Reservoir
- Total capacity: 70×10^{6} m^{3} (57,000 acre⋅ft)

The Yacoub el Mansour Dam (Barrage Yacoub el Mansour) is a BCR (bulked concrete rubble) dam located at Ouirgane on the N'fis River in Al Haouz Province, Morocco. Completed in 2008, the dam is intended to improve the supply of drinking and industrial water to the Marrakesh area.

== History ==
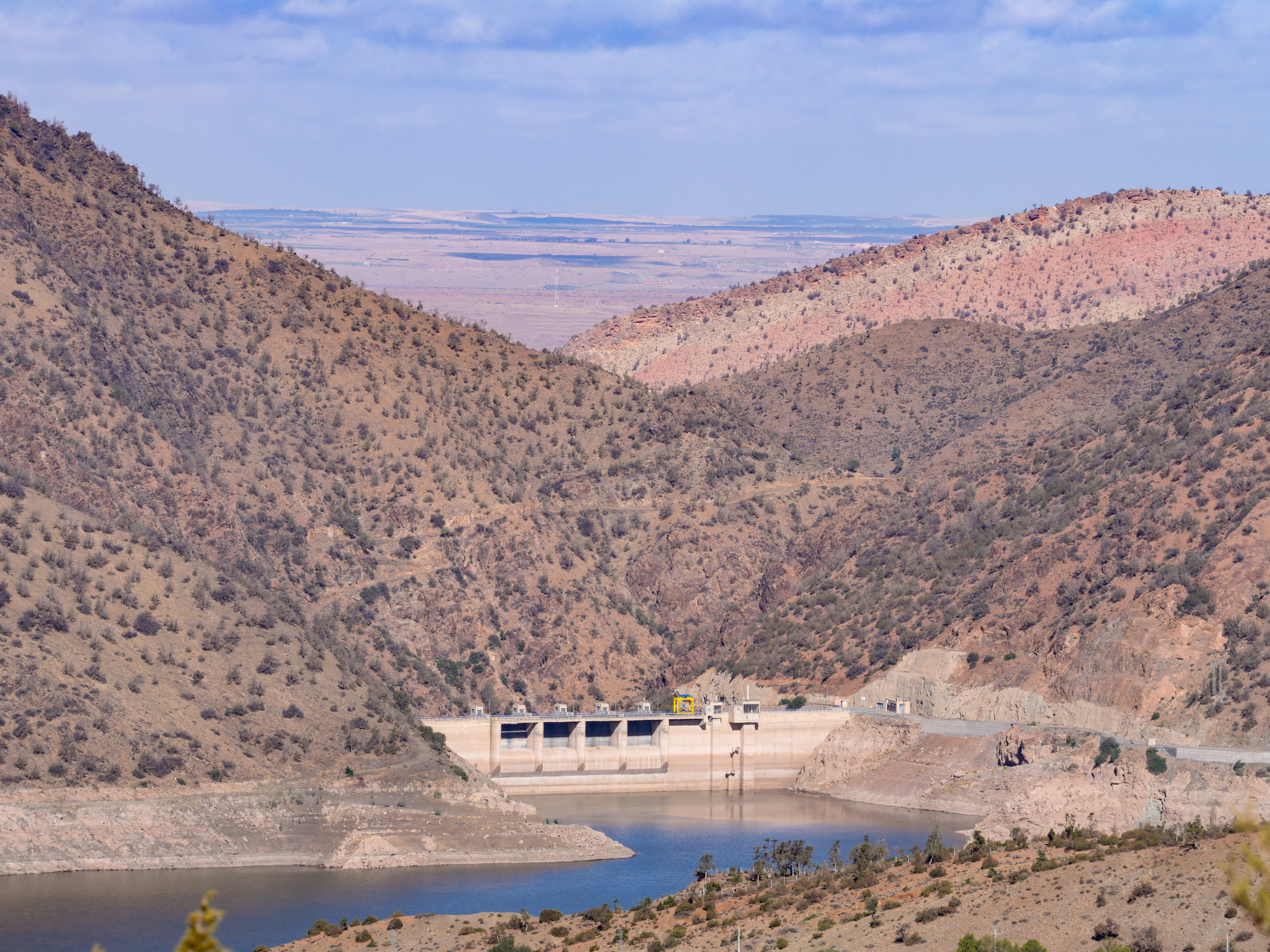
Plains near Marrakesh visible north of the dam

The Takerkoust Dam on the N'Fis river downstream of Ouirgane had provided water to the alluvial plain in the Marrakesh area since 1935. Owing to sedimentation, its capacity had been reduced by 20%. To alleviate this problem, it was decided to build a dam at Ouirgane to reduce silt load in the river especially during floods. The Yacoub el Mansour dam was commissioned in 2008. Subsequently, a study in 2009 found that the siltation rate in the Takerkoust reservoir had reduced.

== Description ==
The Yacoub el Mansour Dam is a bulked concrete rubble (BCR) dam located in the rural commune of Ouirgane at an elevation of 830 m (2,720 ft). It blocks the N'fis river. The height of the dam is 70 m (230 ft) and its crest length is 233 m (764 ft). The dam has a spillway, a bottom outlet, four stepped water intakes and a neck dyke on the right bank. Construction required excavation of 226,000 m^{3} (296,000 cu yd) earth and pouring of 330,000 m^{3} (430,000 cu yd) of concrete.

== Reservoir ==
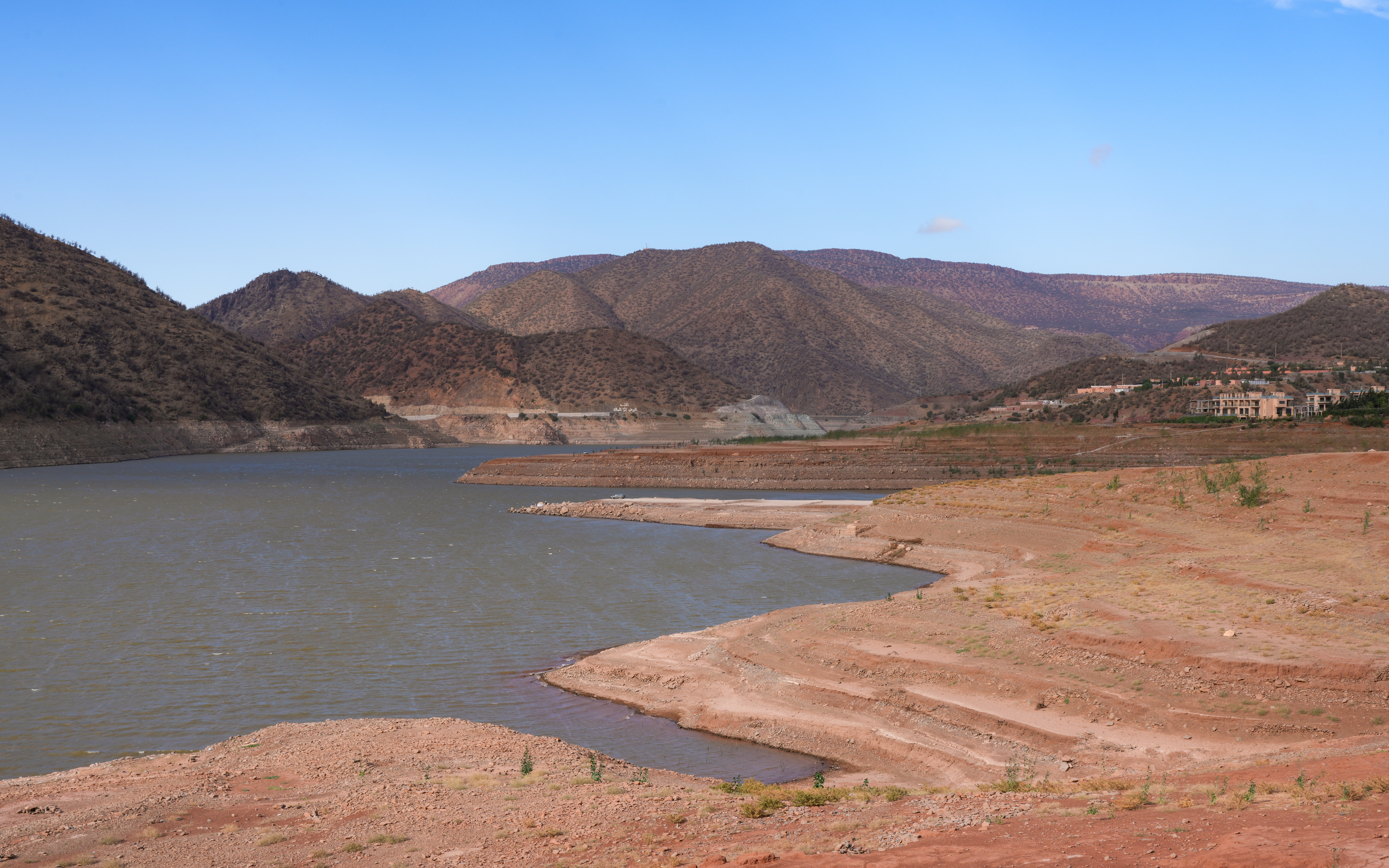
North half of the reservoir

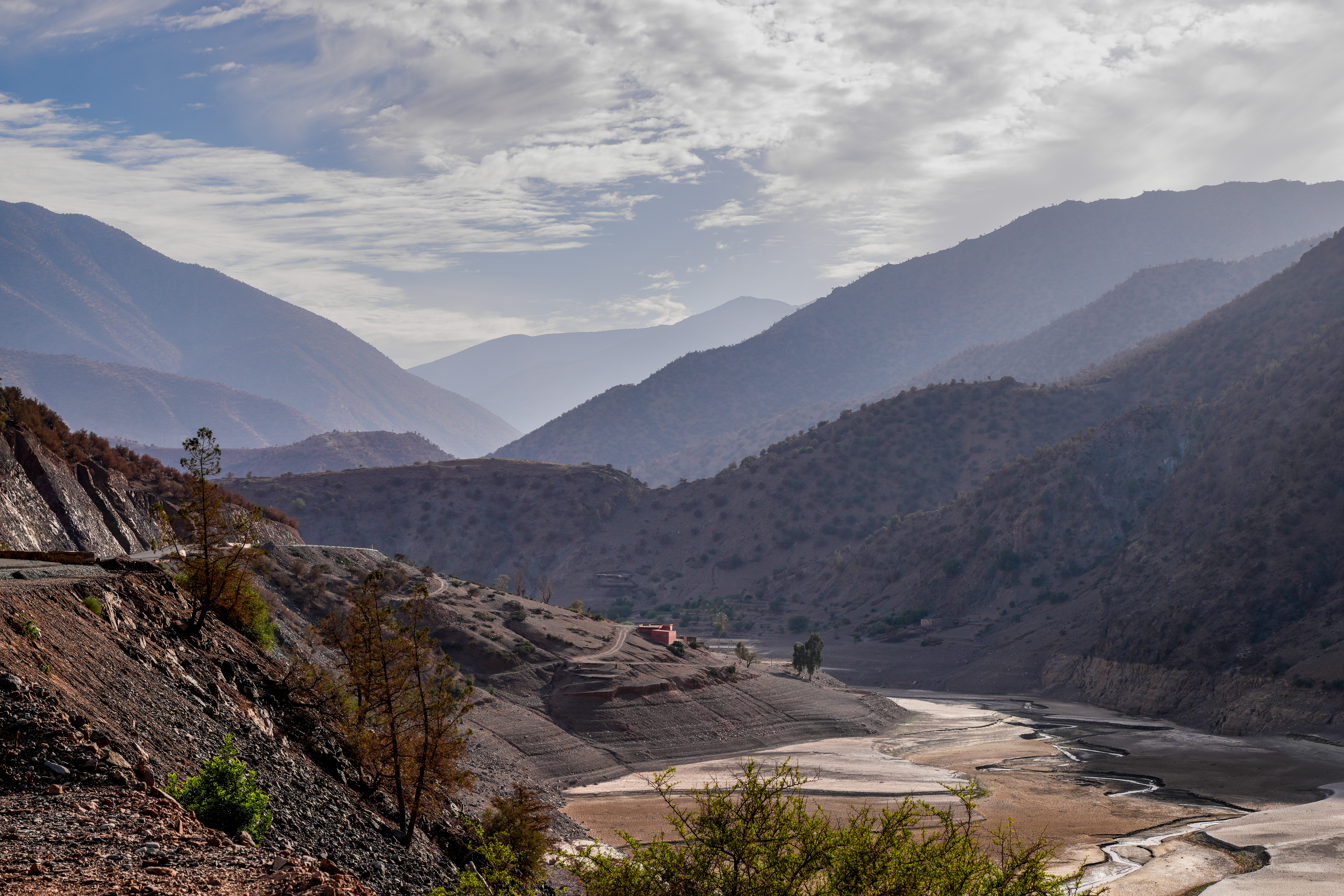
View the N'Fis stream at the head of the reservoir

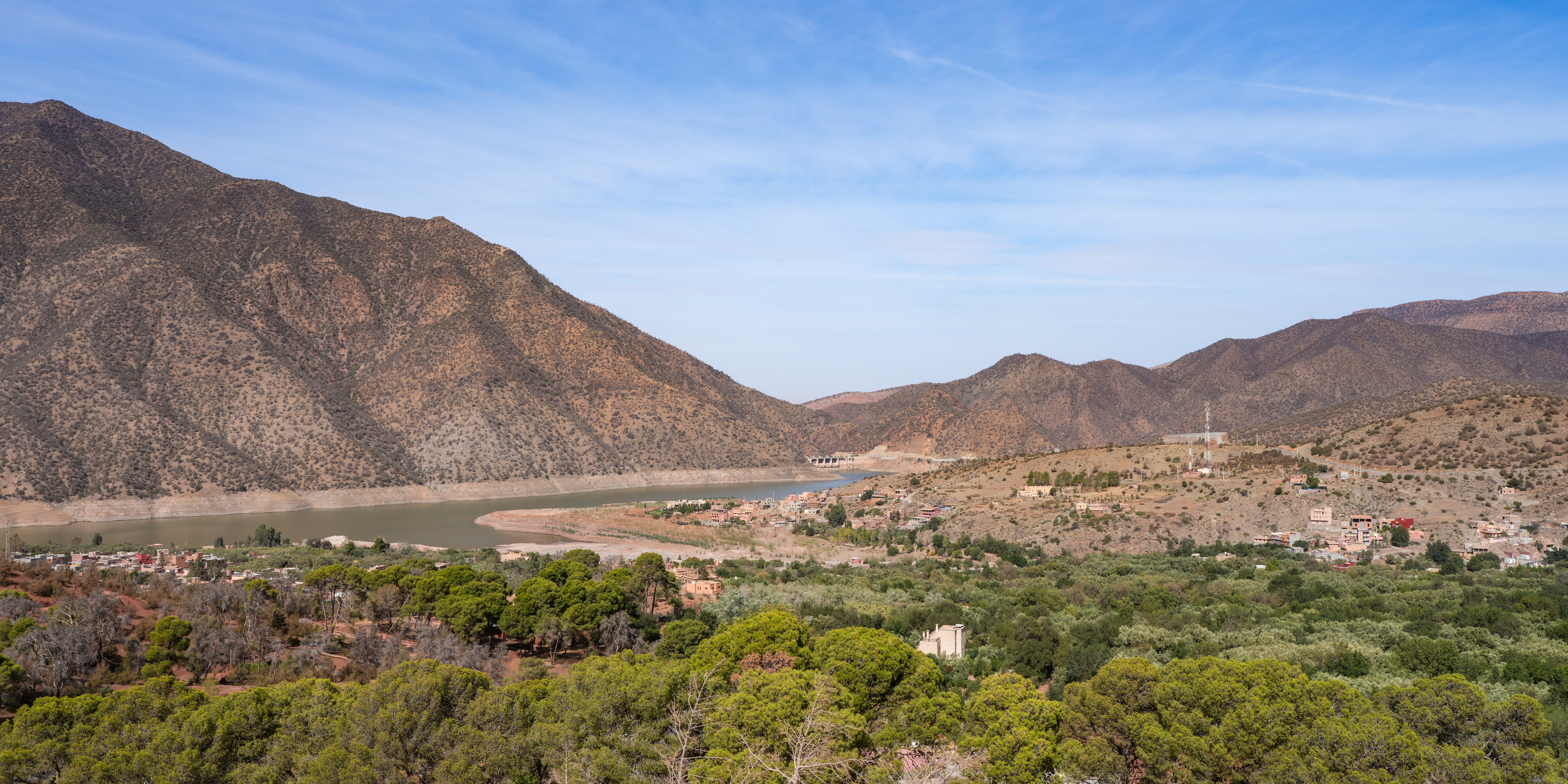
Olive groves and Ouirgane east of the reservoir

The Yacoub el Mansour Reservoir, also known as the Ouirgane Reservoir, has a capacity of 70,000,000 m^{3} (92,000,000 cu yd). It is designed to increase the water supply to the Marrakesh area from 68,000,000 to 85,000,000 m^{3} (89,000,000 to 111,000,000 cu yd) per year. The rural commune of Ouirgane is situated on the east bank of the reservoir. The reservoir is a scenic backdrop to Ouirgane. There are hiking trails around the reservoir. It provides opportunities for picnics and fishing.

== See also ==
- Ouirgane
