= Ahmed Toufiq =

Moroccan writer and scholar (born 1943)

- احمد توفيق

Minister of Religious Endowments and Islamic Affairs
- Incumbent
- Assumed office 7 September 2002
- Monarch: Mohammed VI
- Prime Minister: Abderrahmane Youssoufi; Driss Jettou; Abbas El Fassi; Abdelilah Benkirane; Saadeddine Othmani; Aziz Akhannouch
- Preceded by: Abdelkebir M'Daghri Alaoui

Personal details
- Born: 25 June 1943 (age 83) Marigha, Morocco

Academic background
- Education: Mohammed V University
- Thesis: al-Mujtamaʿ al-Maghribī fī al-Qarn al-Tāsiʿa ʿAshar: ʼInūltāne (1850-1912)
- Doctoral advisor: Germain Ayache

Academic work
- Discipline: Historian

Ahmed Toufiq (born 22 June 1943) is a Moroccan historian and novelist who has been serving as Minister for Islamic Affairs in the government of Morocco since 2002.

== Biography ==
Toufiq was born on 22 June 1943 in Marigha village (part of the Ouirgane commune) in the High Atlas. After completing his primary and secondary studies in Marrakesh, he enrolled at the Faculty of Letters and Human Sciences of Rabat, where he earned a bachelor's degree in history in 1968, then a master's degree in history. Toufiq also holds a certificate of Archaeology. He presented his PhD in 1979 on the subject of social history in the Moroccan rural areas in the 19th century.

He started his career as a teacher at L'École Normale Supérieure de Marrakesh and taught in a high school in Rabat. Thereafter, he joined the Faculty of Letters and Human Sciences in Rabat, where he served in various roles from 1970 to 1989; lecturer, assistant professor, associate professor. He was appointed director of the Institute of African Studies at the Mohammed V University in 1989. holding the position for six years until 1995. From 1995 to 2002, he worked as director of the National Library of Morocco.

In 1989, Toufiq received his first Moroccan Book Prize for his novel Shajarat Hinna' Wa Qamar (A Tree of Henna and a Moon). In 2001, he served as a Visiting Professor of Islamic Studies at Harvard Divinity School, affiliated with its Center for the Study of World Religions.

In November 2002, Toufiq was appointed to the government as Minister for Islamic Affairs. He is also a personal advocate of interfaith dialogue and currently sits on the Board of World Religious Leaders for The Elijah Interfaith Institute. Toufiq is a Sufi.

Toufiq is a member of Advisory Committee of UNESCO's Memory of the World Programme.

== Bibliography ==
Historical studies

- La société marocaine au XIXe siècle - Inoultane 1850 - 1912
- Islam et développement
- Les juifs de Demnat
- Le Maroc et l'Afrique Occidentale à travers les âges

Novels

- Abu Musa's Women Neighbors (translated by Roger Allen, from Jarat Abi Musa, 1997, ISBN 2-87623-215-4)
- Al Sayl (The Stream, 1998)
- Shujayrat Hinna' Wa Qamar (translated by Roger Allen, Moon and Henna Tree, 2013, ISBN 0292748248)
