= Talat N'Yaaqoub =

Coordinates: 30.9903°N 8.1772°W

- Rural commune and town
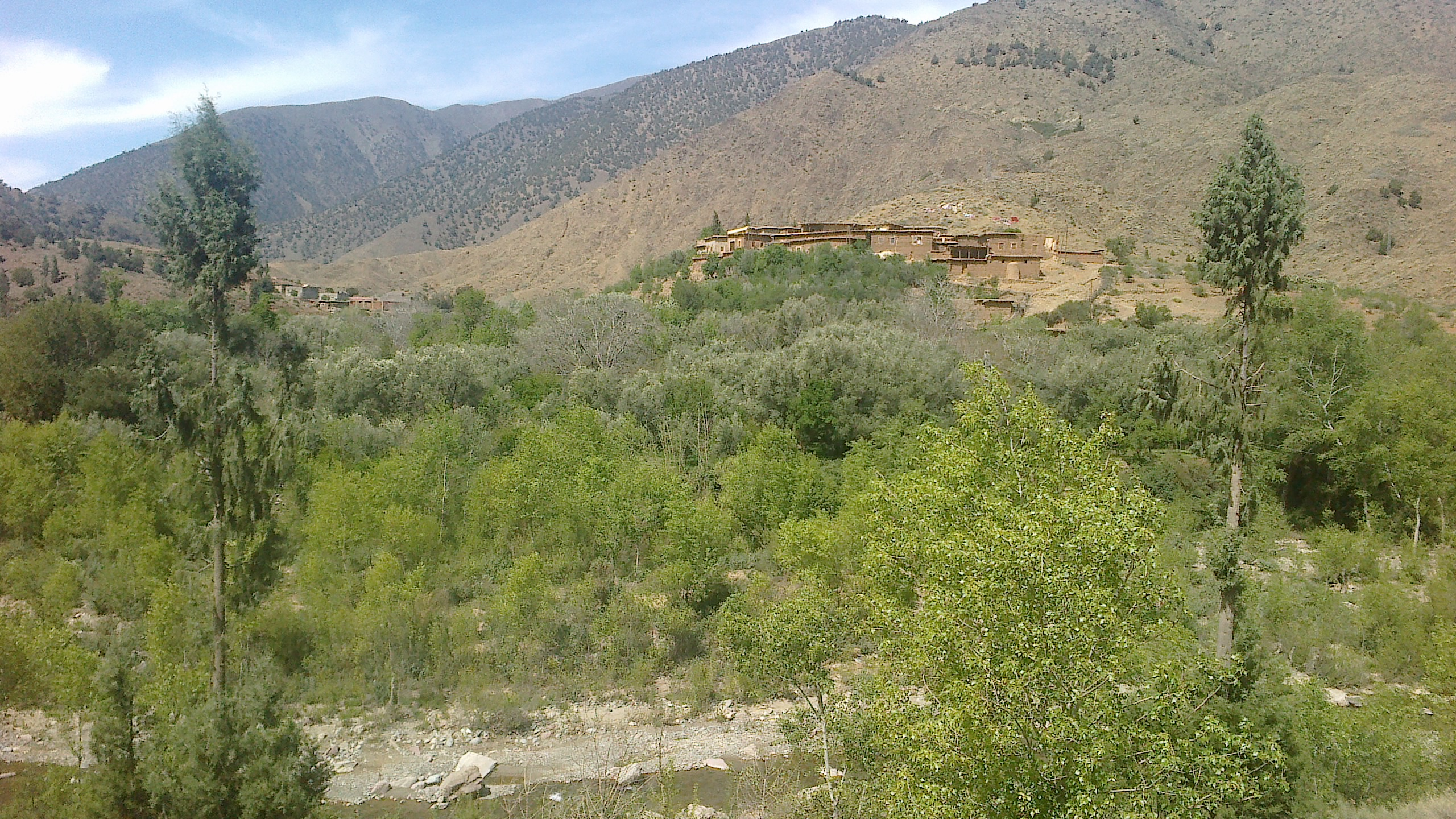
- Interactive map of Talat N'Yaaqoub
- Country: Morocco
- Region: Marrakesh-Safi
- Province: Al Haouz Province

Population (2004)
  - Total: 7,702
- Time zone: UTC+0 (GMT)

Talat N'Yaaqoub is a small town and rural commune in Al Haouz Province, Morocco. At the time of the 2004 census, the commune had a total population of 7702 people living in 1494 households.

The commune is home to the historic town of Tinmel, the birthplace of the Almohad movement.
