= Tinmal Mosque =

Historic monument in Tinmel, Morocco

- ⵜⵉⵎⵣⴳⵉⴷ ⵏ ⵜⵉⵏⵎⵍ
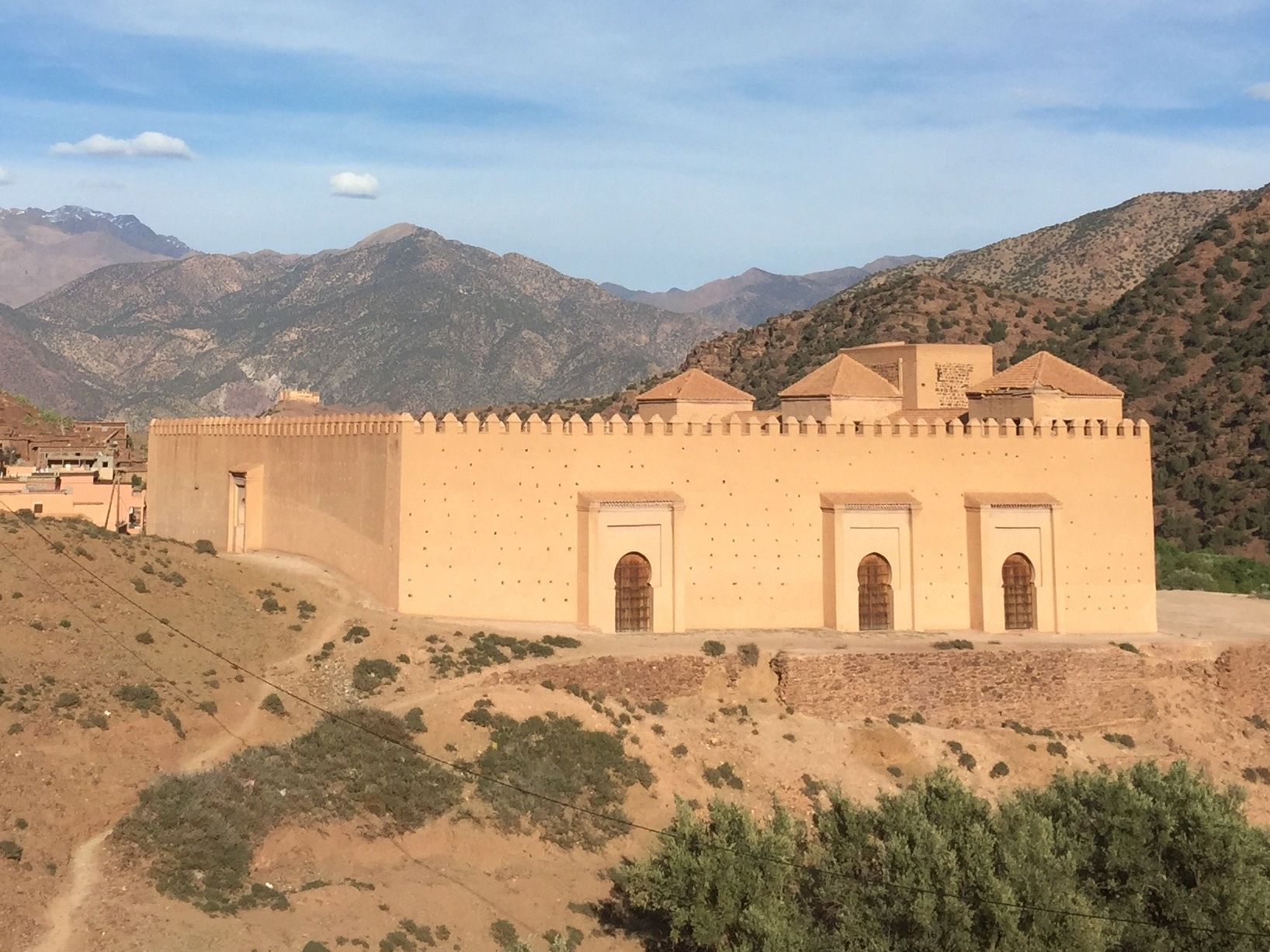
- The mosque in 2018 (Note: All images on this page date from before the September 2023 earthquake, unless otherwise indicated.)

Religion
- Affiliation: Islam
- Status: inactive

Location
- Location: Tinmel, Morocco
- Interactive map of Tinmal Mosque
- Coordinates: 30°59′5.4″N 8°13′42.1″W

Architecture
- Type: mosque
- Style: Moorish (Almohad)
- Founder: Abd al-Mu'min
- Established: 1148 CE

Specifications
- Minaret: 1
- Materials: brick

The Tinmal Mosque or Great Mosque of Tinmal (Note: Sometimes also spelled Tinmel or Tin Mal. Tachelhit: ⵜⵉⵎⵣⴳⵉⴷ ⵏ ⵜⵉⵏⵎⵍ; Arabic: مسجد تينمل.) is a 12th-century mosque located in the village of Tinmel in the High Atlas Mountains of Morocco. Although no longer operating as a mosque today, its remains are preserved as a historic site. It was built at the site where Ibn Tumart, the founder of the Almohad movement, was buried and it is considered an important example of Almohad architecture.

The mosque was added to the Tentative List of potential UNESCO World Heritage Sites in 1995. It suffered significant damage during the 2023 Marrakesh–Safi earthquake.

== History ==
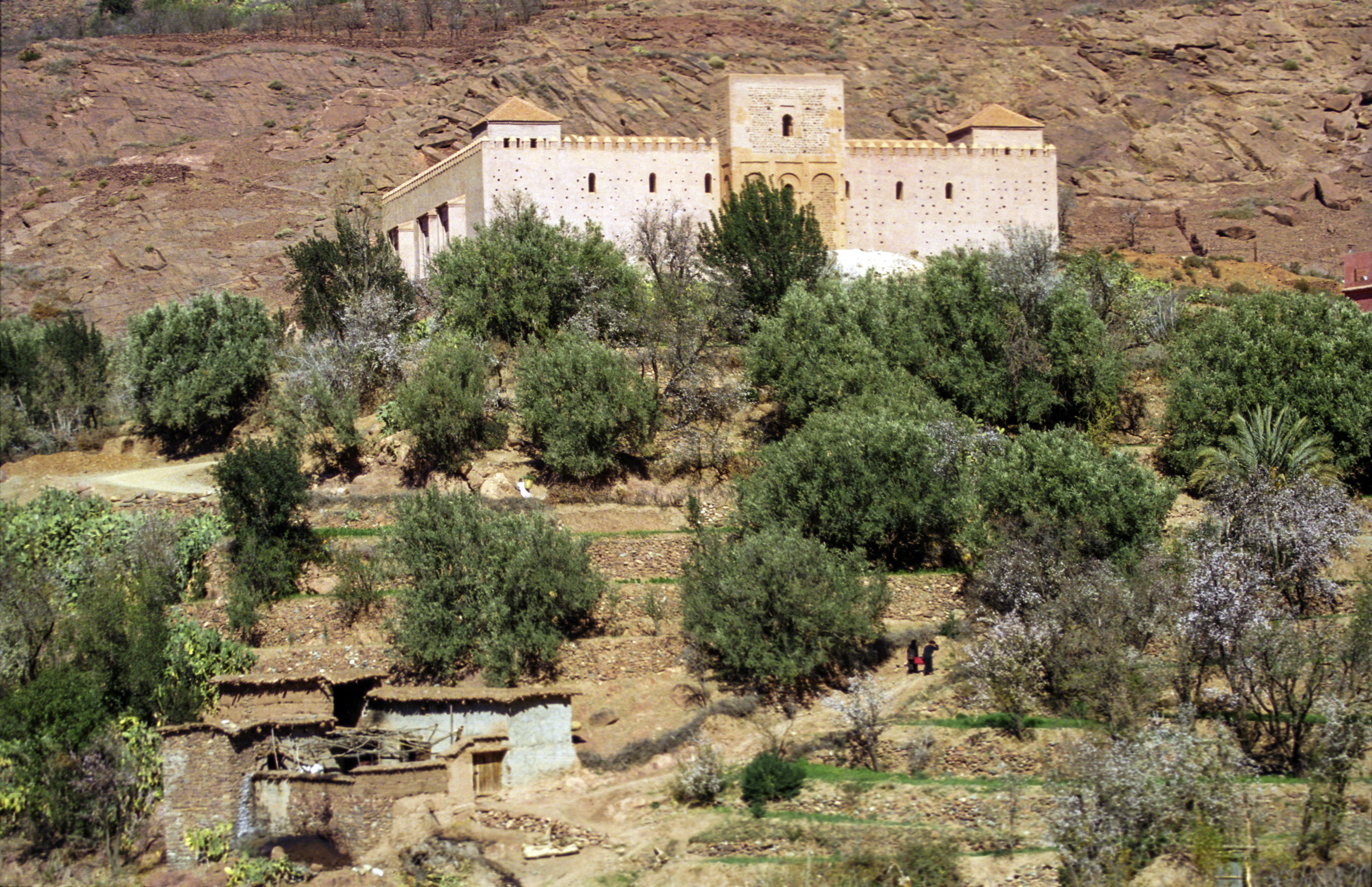
View of the mosque perched above the village of Tinmel

Tinmel is located along the important High Atlas mountain pass known as Tizi-n-Test between Marrakesh to the north and the Sous region to the south. It was the first capital of the Almohad movement founded by Ibn Tumart. He established his followers here in 1124 or 1125 CE and it became the base from which they launched attacks on the Almoravids who ruled the region at the time. A first mosque was built here around this time or shortly after.

When Ibn Tumart died in 1130 he was buried here and a religious sanctuary and pilgrimage site subsequently developed at the site of his tomb. Abd al-Mu'min, who took over leadership of the Almohads after him, decided to build a new mosque nearby or on the same site in 1148, as confirmed by historical documents of the time – although the foundation date of 1153-1154 CE (548 AH) given by the Rawd al-Qirtas is still cited by many. The new mosque most likely replaced the existing mosque of Tinmel that was present here. Construction of the mosque thus began very soon after the conquest of Marrakesh (1147) and the beginning of construction on the Kutubiyya Mosque there. The Tinmal Mosque's architecture demonstrates many similarities with the Kutubiyya and was likely designed and built by craftsmen from Marrakesh. The mosque was smaller in scale than other major Almohad mosques as it was designed for a small town, but it was nonetheless a pilgrimage site and subsequent Almohad rulers were buried near here as well. Later, as the Marinids wrested control of Morocco from them, the Almohads of Marrakesh made a final stand in Tinmel until their last leaders were defeated and captured here in 1275.

The mosque eventually fell into ruin and was partly restored in the mid-20th century. Further restoration works were undertaken in the 1990s. The mosque no longer operates as a religious building but was opened to visitors as a historic site, making it one of the few mosque buildings in Morocco open to non-Muslims. The site has been on UNESCO's Tentative List of World Heritage Sites since 1995.

As of January 2023, work was underway on a new restoration of the mosque overseen by the Ministry of Habous and Islamic Affairs, projected to last 18 months. The plan also called for the eventual construction of a museum next to the mosque.

=== 2023 earthquake ===
The mosque was severely damaged in a major earthquake in September 2023. Parts of the minaret tower and some walls appeared to have collapsed. The Moroccan Culture Ministry responded by stating that the mosque would be restored, while UNESCO indicated it would send a team to evaluate the damage. Prior to the earthquake, the renovation of the mosque was in its final stage. An early assessment in October 2023 estimated that 75% of the building was destroyed, although more complete destruction was avoided because the terrace on which the mosque stands did not collapse. The building was not yet safe enough to enter for a full evaluation. The extent of damage to the historic mihrab was not yet known as it was obscured by the debris of the collapsed roof in front of it.

Damage from the 2023 earthquake

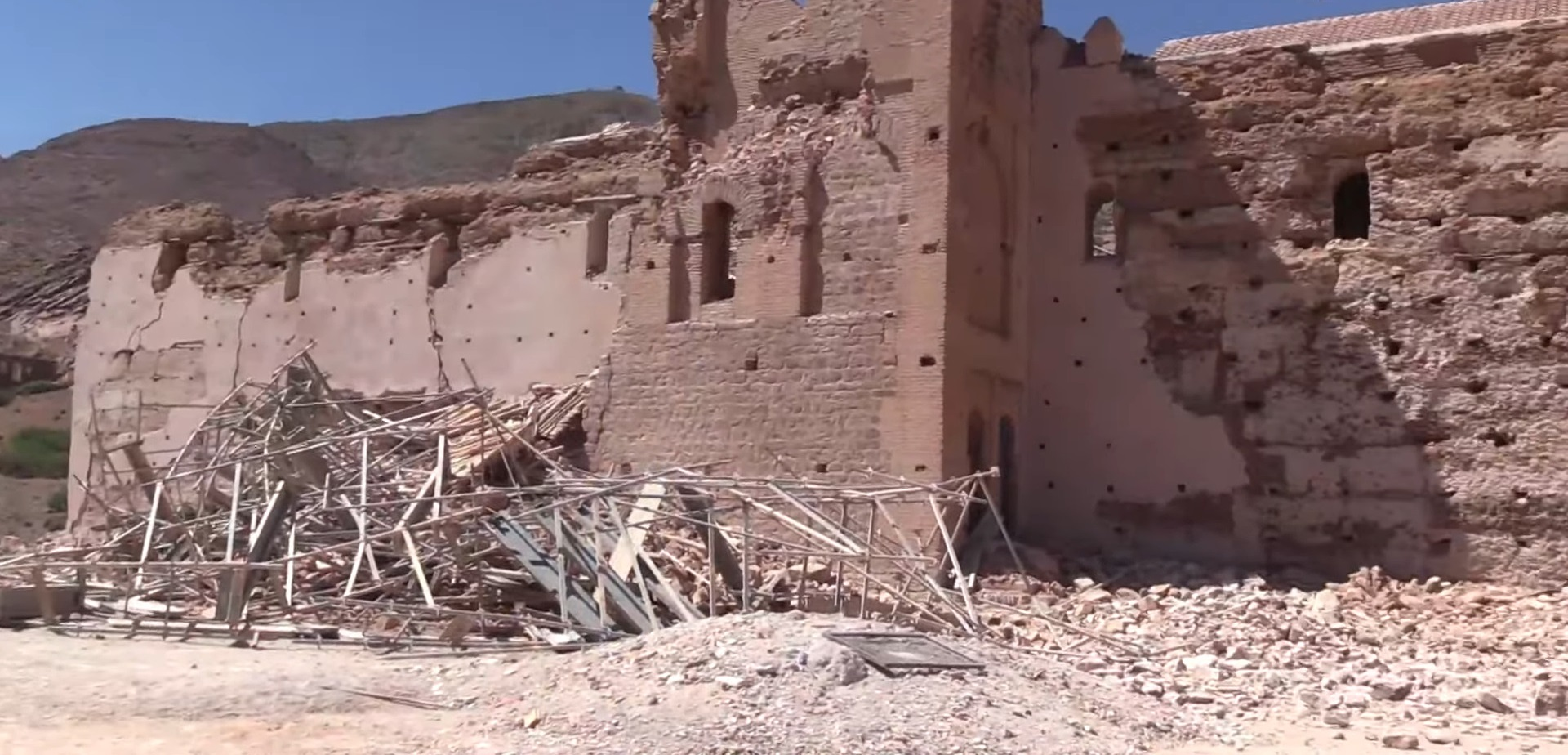
View of the mosque's southeast side (behind the qibla wall) and the partly-collapsed minaret tower (September 2023)

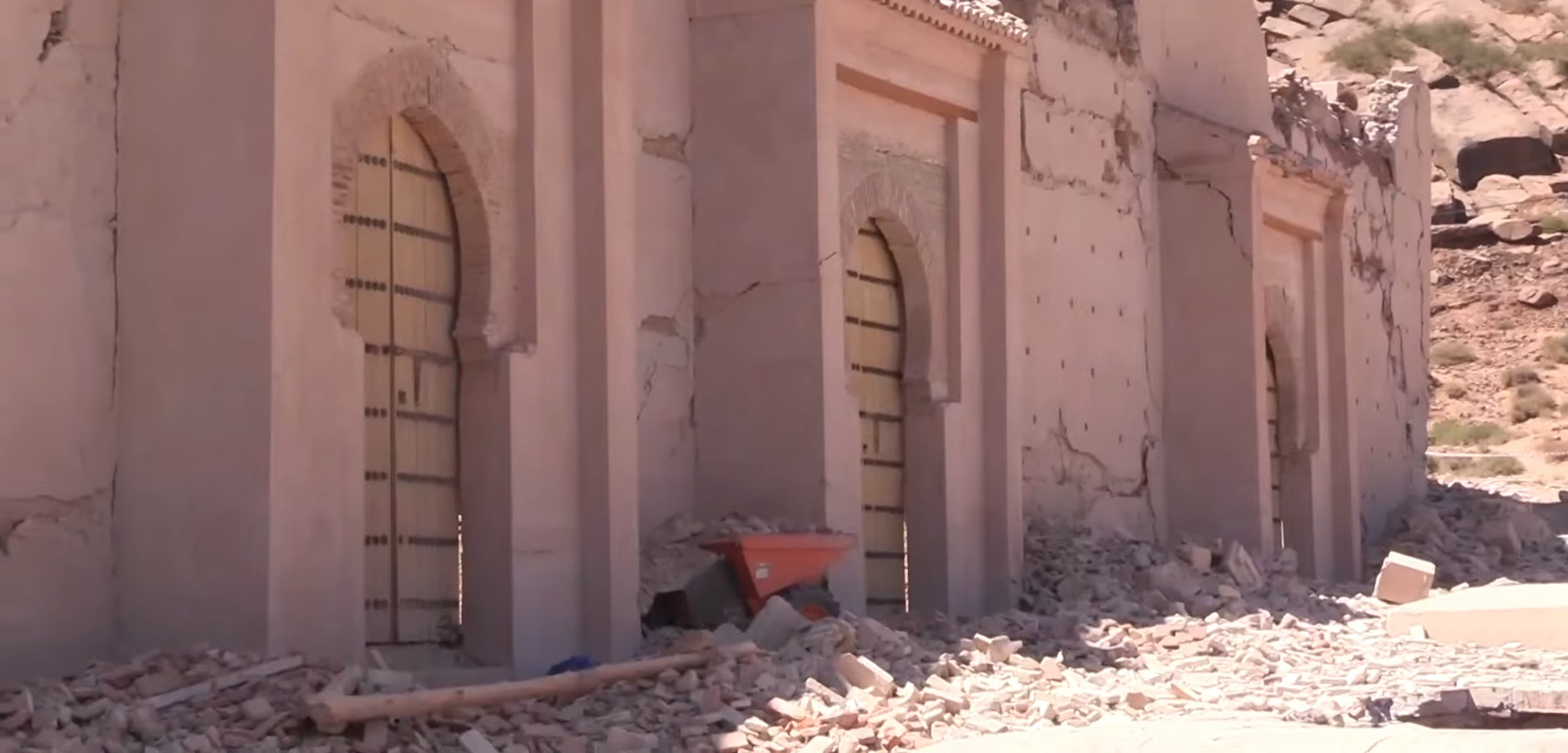
View of the mosque's northeast side (September 2023)

In November 2023, Moroccan news outlet Médias24 published an article criticizing the clearance of debris from the mosque, alleging it was being done without proper supervision from archeologists and that historical fragments were potentially being lost in the process. A subsequent article by Le Desk, another Moroccan news outlet, has challenged this allegation, quoting Aboulkacem Chebri, president of the Moroccan branch of ICOMOS, who states that historical fragments from the site were being collected and stored appropriately, including those that could potentially be reused during reconstruction.

In May 2024 it was reported that the restoration of the mosque will be aided by the Italian Ministry of Culture, at the request of the Moroccan government's Ministry of Habous and Islamic Affairs. The Italian architect Aldo Giorgio Pezzi has been sent to assist in the project.

== Architecture ==
=== Exterior ===
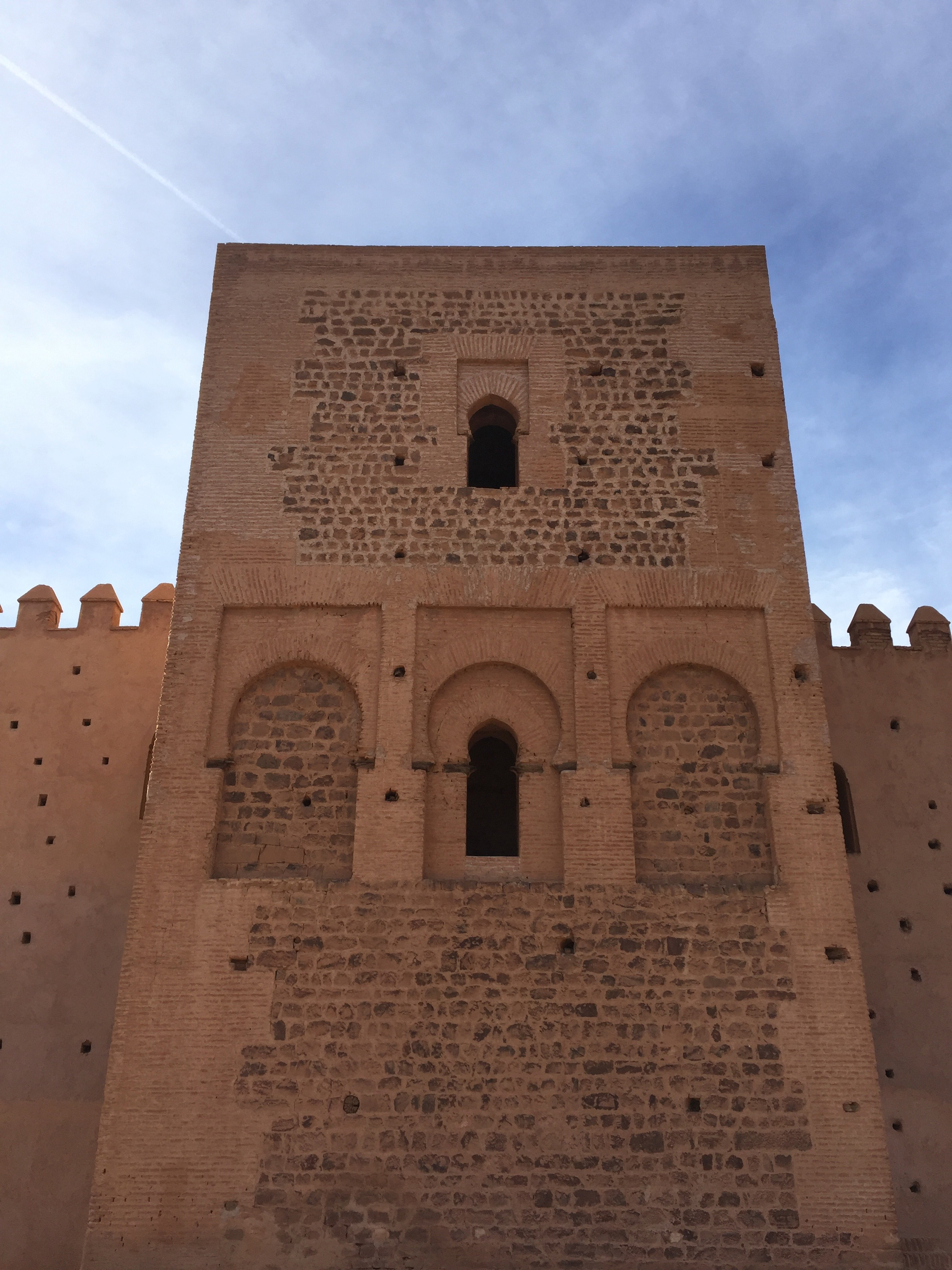
The minaret of the mosque

The building has a fortress-like exterior appearance with thick plain walls, which was characteristic of other Almohad mosques and buildings as well. It has a roughly quadrangular floor plan measuring 43 by 40 metres. A more unusual feature was the position and form of the minaret, located at the middle of its southern wall on top of the mihrab; a design feature which is not found in other historic mosques. The minaret has a rectangular base and projects outwards from the surrounding outer wall, but has a truncated or unfinished appearance, contrasting with the bold and monumental minarets of other Almohad mosques that came after (such as the minaret of the Kutubiyya or the Giralda in Seville). The mosque has seven entrances: three on both its east and west sides and one central entrance to the north.

=== Interior ===
Inside, the mosque has a typical hypostyle layout with an interior courtyard. The main prayer hall is divided into nine "naves" (running roughly north to south) by rows of pointed horseshoe arches. Another aisle, perpendicular to these rows of arches (running roughly east to west), runs along the southern wall (the qibla wall towards which worshippers prayed). The mosque is a notable example of the "T-plan" or "T-type" mosque which is found in earlier Almoravid architecture and was standard for later medieval Moroccan mosques: the aisle running parallel to the qibla wall and the middle nave leading to the mihrab, running perpendicular to that wall, are wider and more prominent than the other aisles of the mosque and thus draw a "T" shape in the floor plan of the building.

The southern aisle of the qibla wall also features three muqarnas ("honeycomb" or "stalactite") cupolas: one at the middle, in front of the mihrab, and one at either end, at the southern corners of the mosque. Each cupola is also flanked by "lambrequin" or "muqarnas" arches below, whose intrados are enhanced with carved sebka, muqarnas, and palmette/seashell motifs. Multifoil and lambrequin arches also run along the northern edge of this aisle, further setting it apart from the rest of the mosque. All these decorative flourishes also served to emphasize the southern aisle and middle nave in the T-plan of the mosque.

The rectangular courtyard (sahn) of the mosque occupies a large part of its northern section, corresponding to the width of the mosque's five middle naves and the length of three transversal aisles. It is surrounded on all sides by the arches of the prayer hall and its extensions.

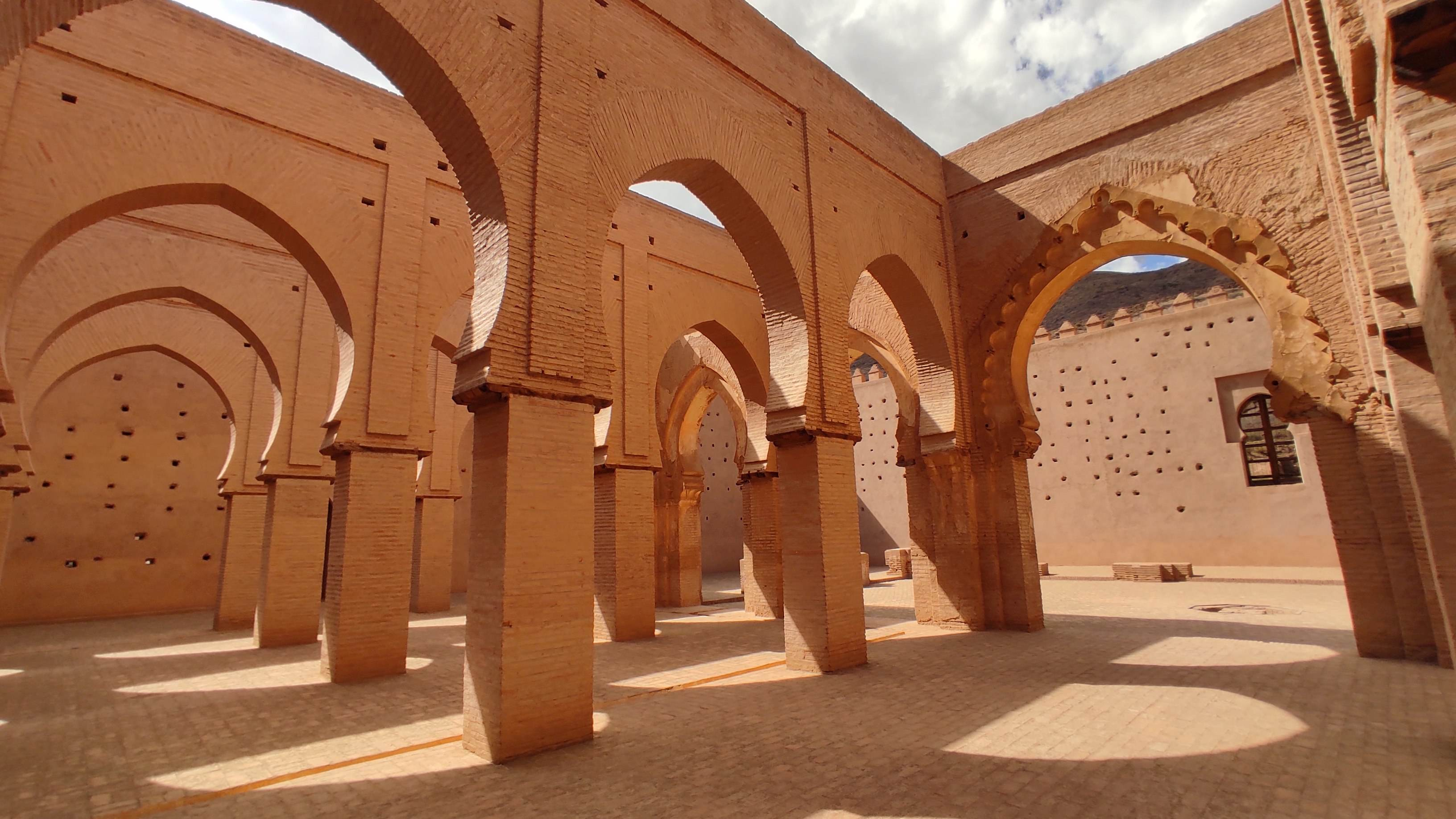
View of the prayer hall, looking towards the courtyard (behind the arches on the right)

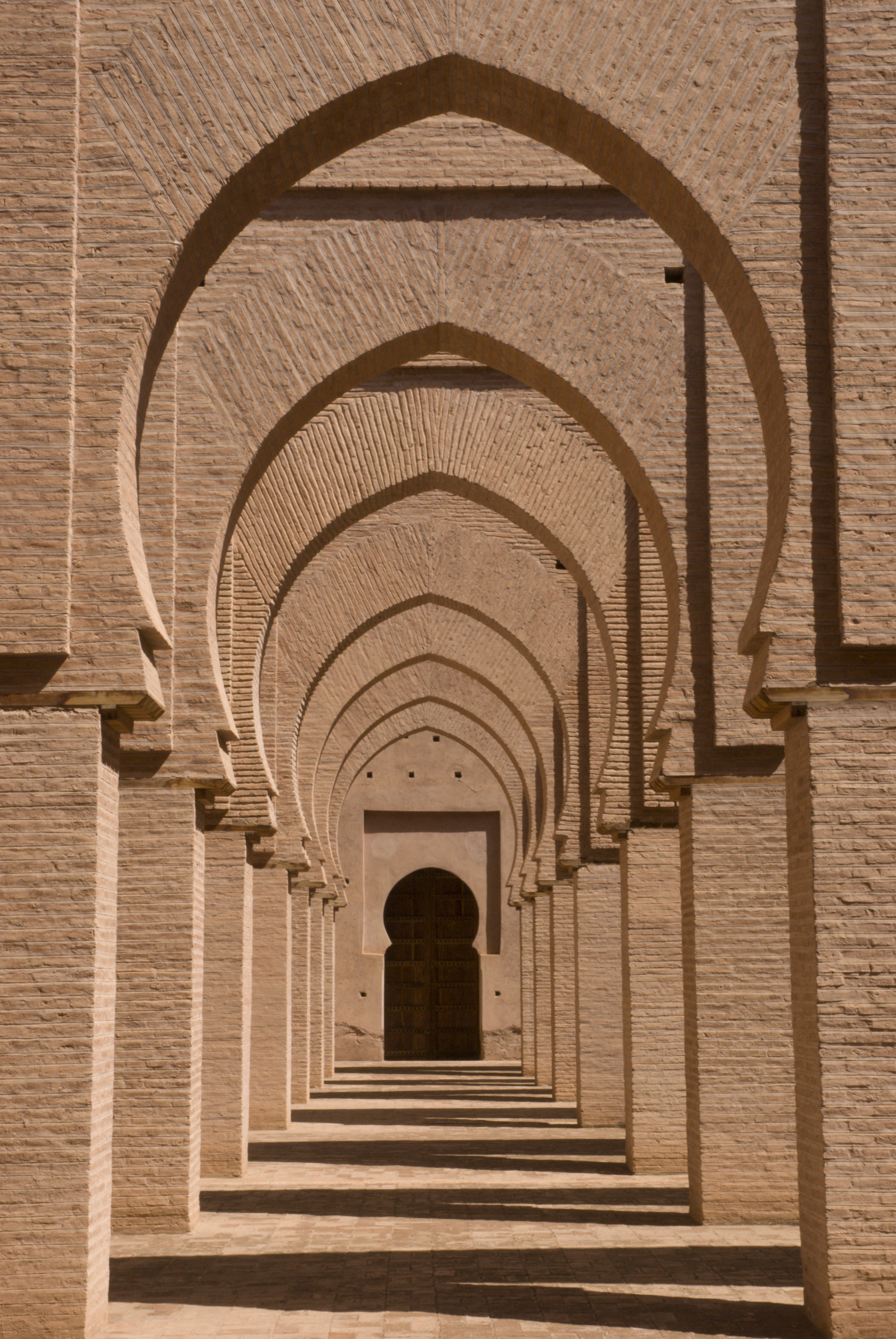
Pointed horseshoe arches in the prayer hall

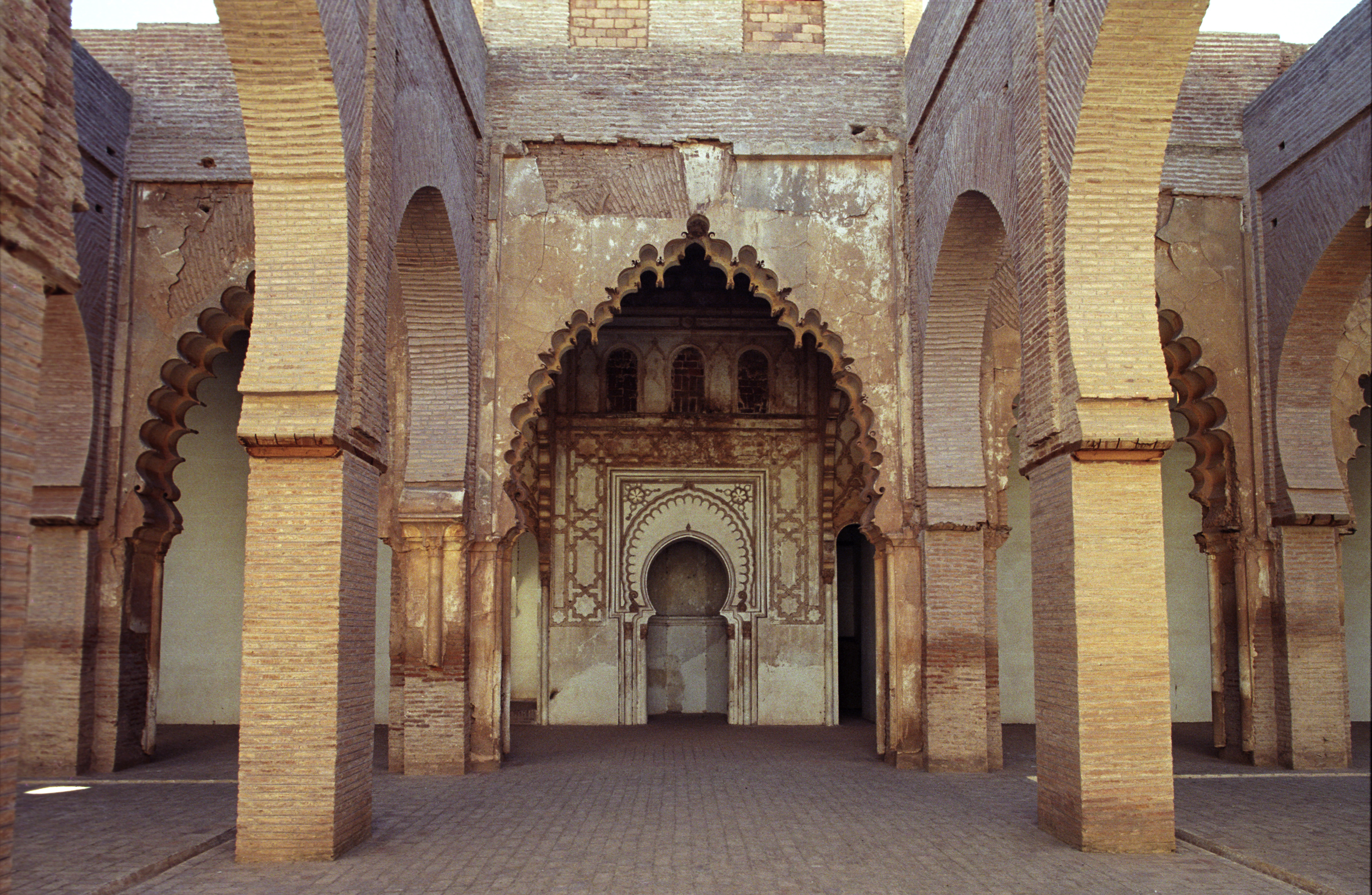
View of the prayer hall, looking towards the mihrab (center). The southernmost aisle, before the mihrab, is demarcated by different arch designs.

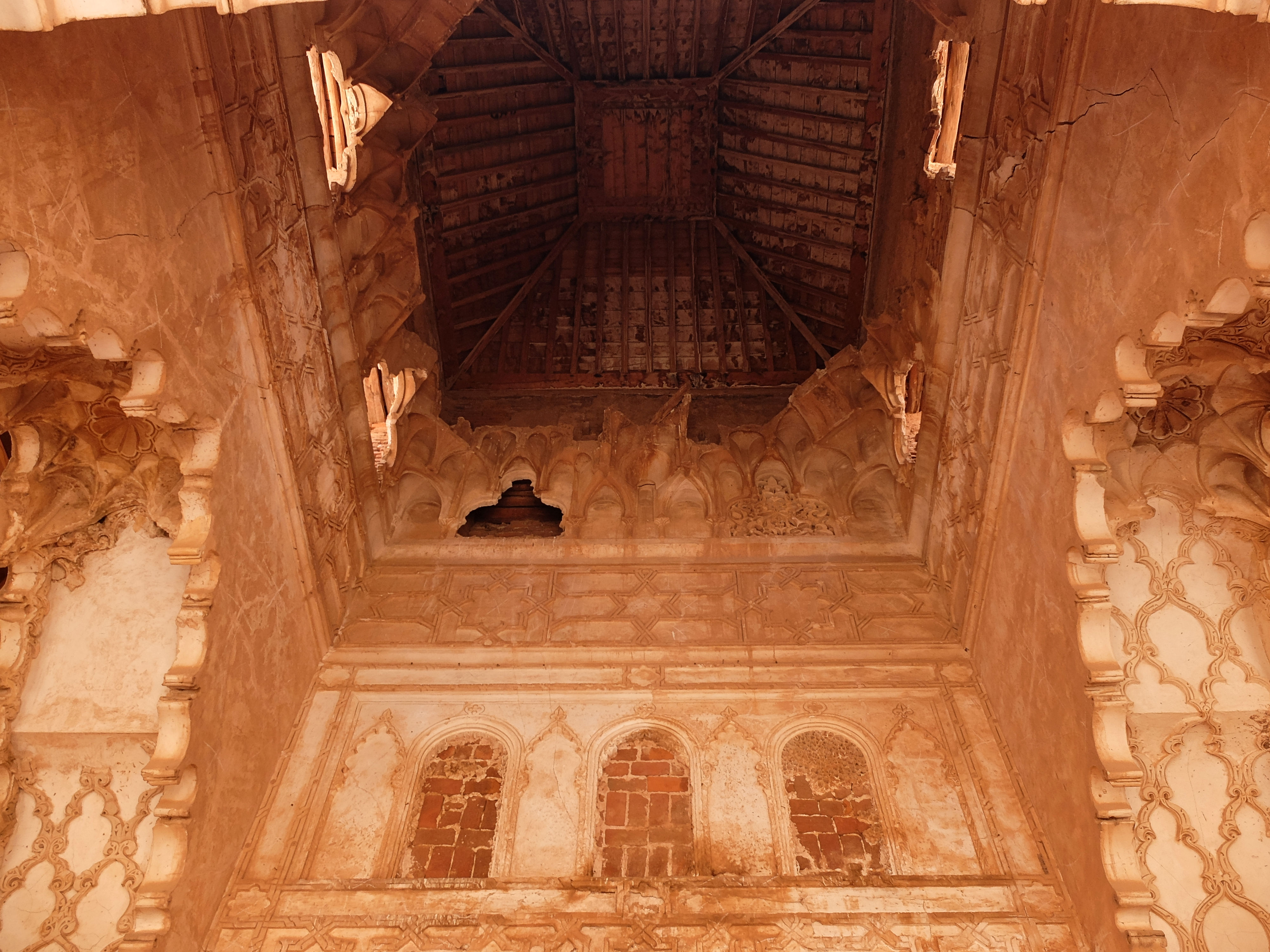
Remains of the former muqarnas cupola in front of the mihrab (2015 photo)

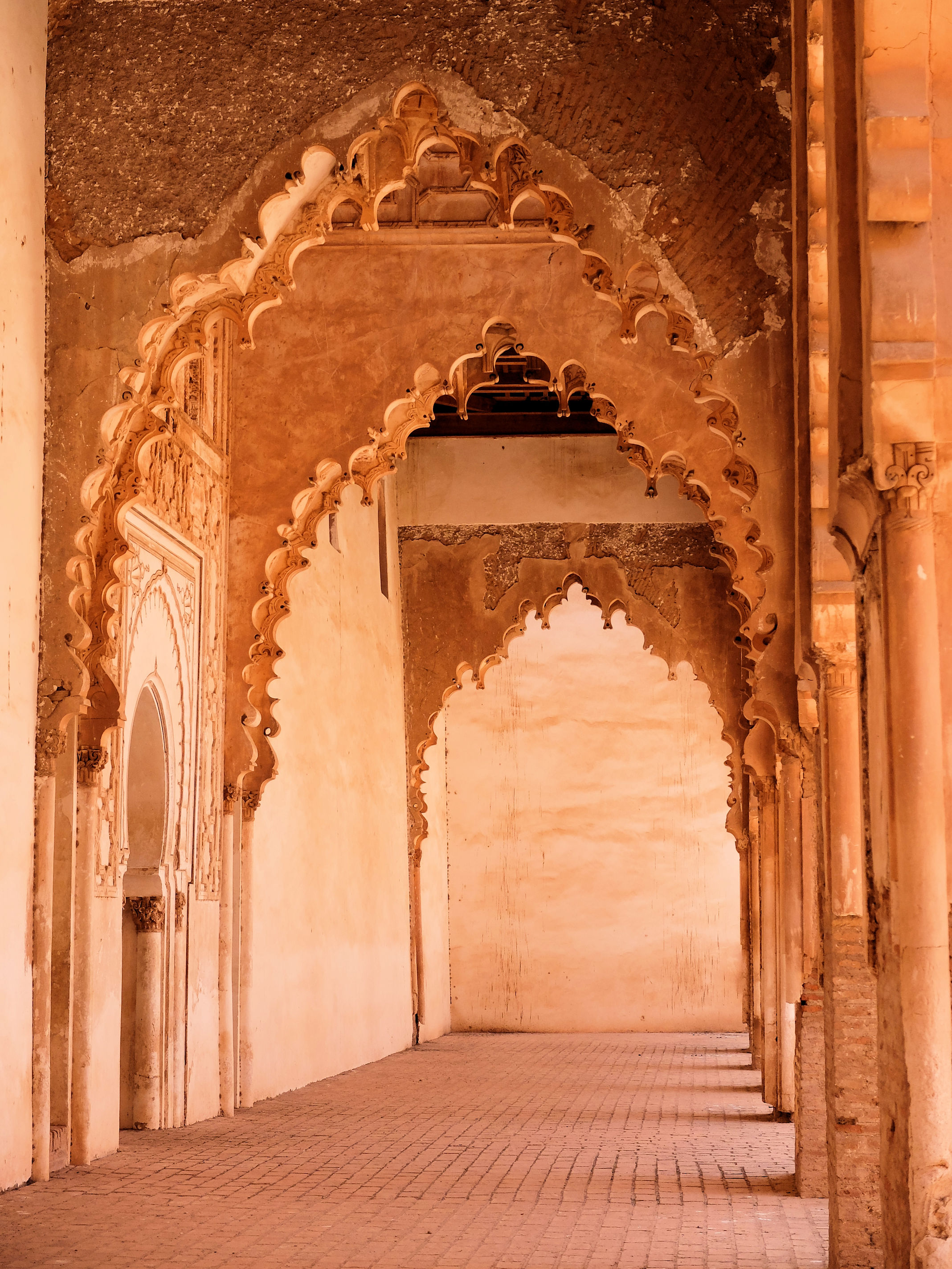
Lambrequin arches in the southern aisle of the mosque

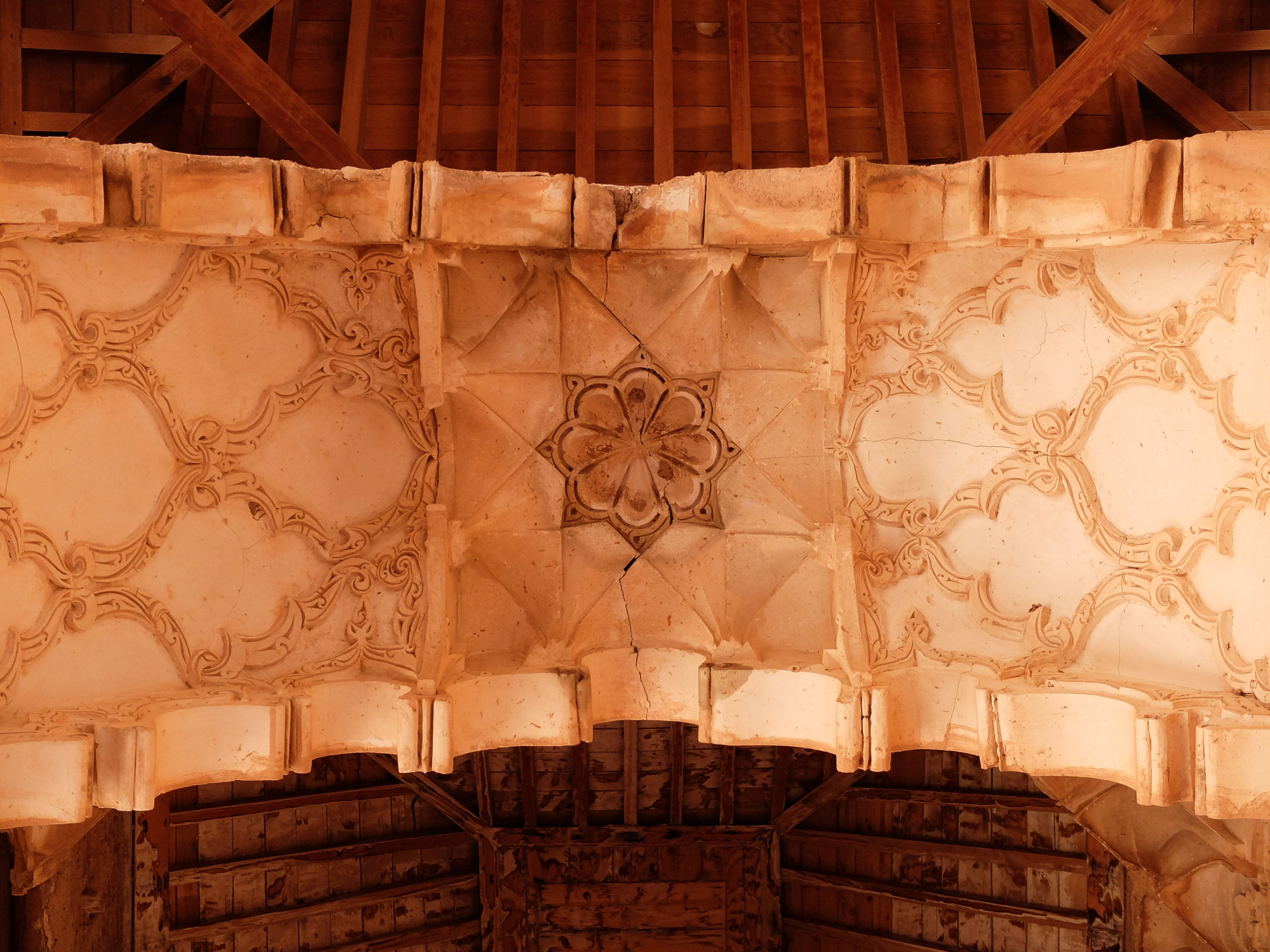
Sebka and other decorative motifs under one of the lambrequin arches next to the mihrab

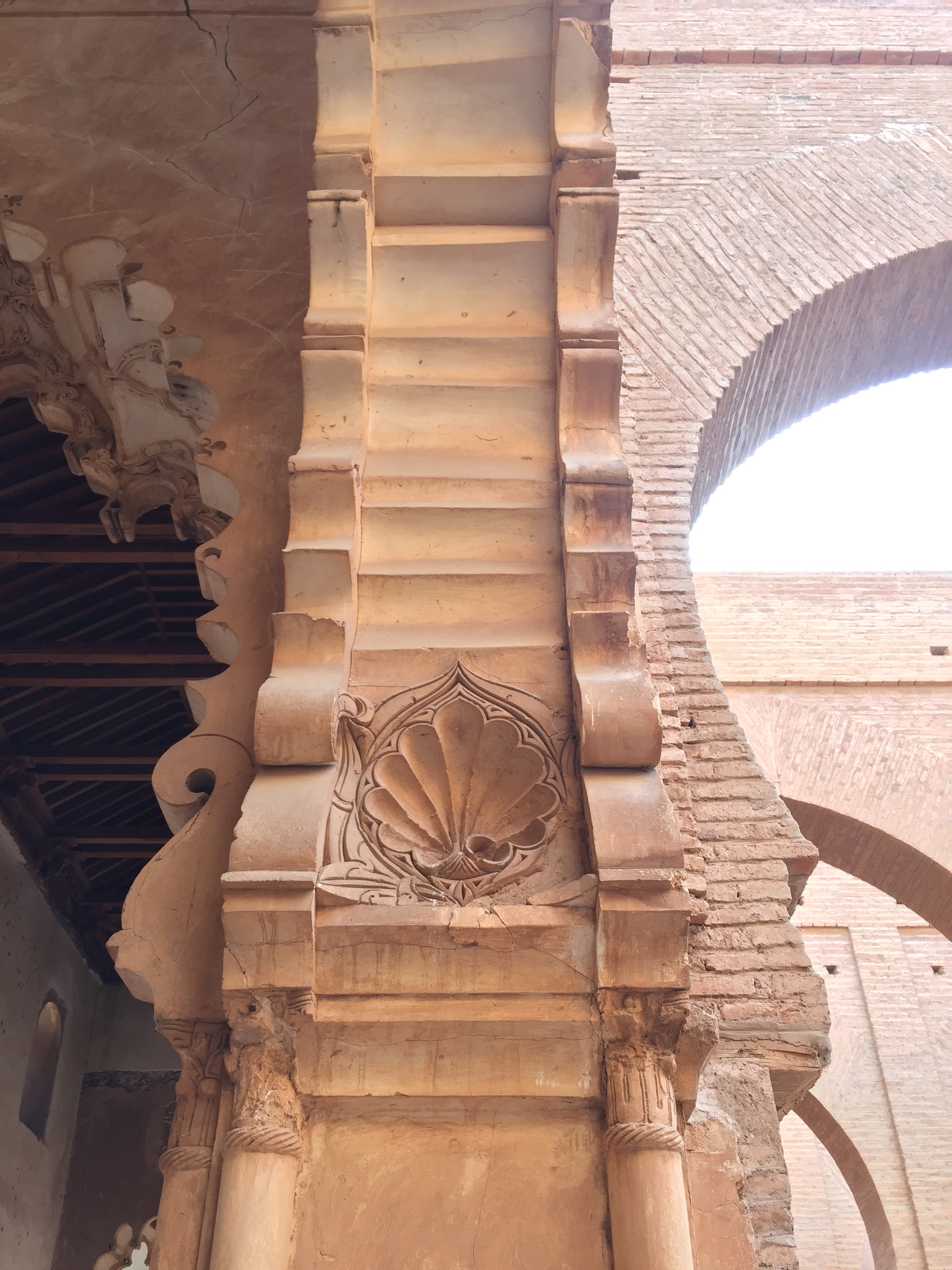
A palmette/seashell motif carved into the arches near the mihrab

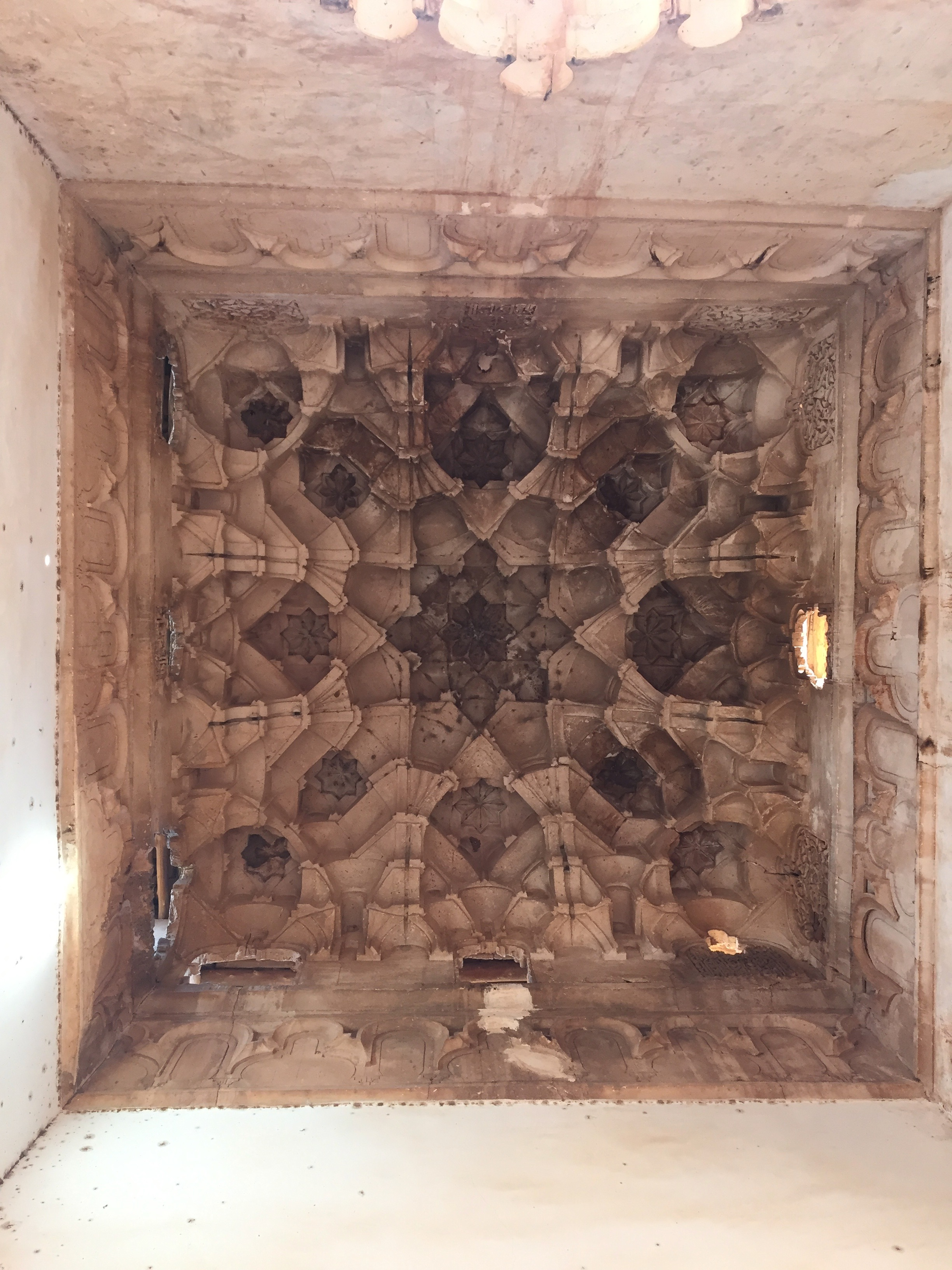
A preserved muqarnas cupola at the southeastern corner of the mosque

==== The mihrab ====
The mihrab (niche symbolizing the qibla), situated in the middle of the southern wall, is similar in form and decoration to that of the Kutubiyya Mosque and other Almohad mosques, consisting of a small octagonal room covered by a muqarnas cupola. This overall form inherits the tradition of the 10th-century mihrab of the Great Mosque of Cordoba, which also consisted of a small octagonal room. The wall surrounding the mihrab's opening is decorated with carved geometric and interlacing motifs in stucco. Unlike the Kutubiyya Mosque, the decorative capitals of the engaged columns around the mihrab are carved from stucco rather than marble. On either side of the mihrab are two tall arched openings: one led to a small chamber where the minbar (pulpit) was stored, while the other led to the imam's entrance at the eastern base of the minaret.

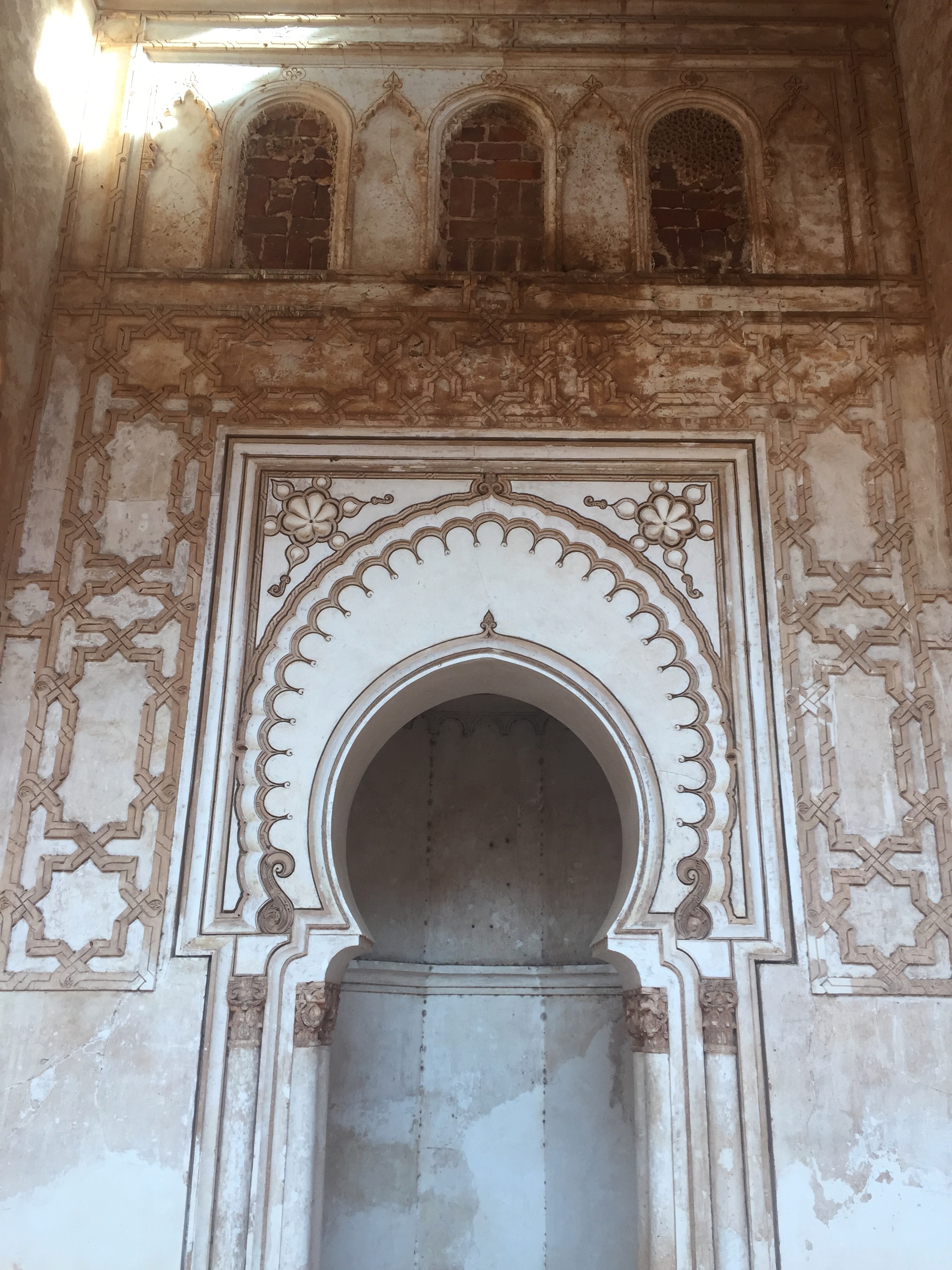
The mihrab

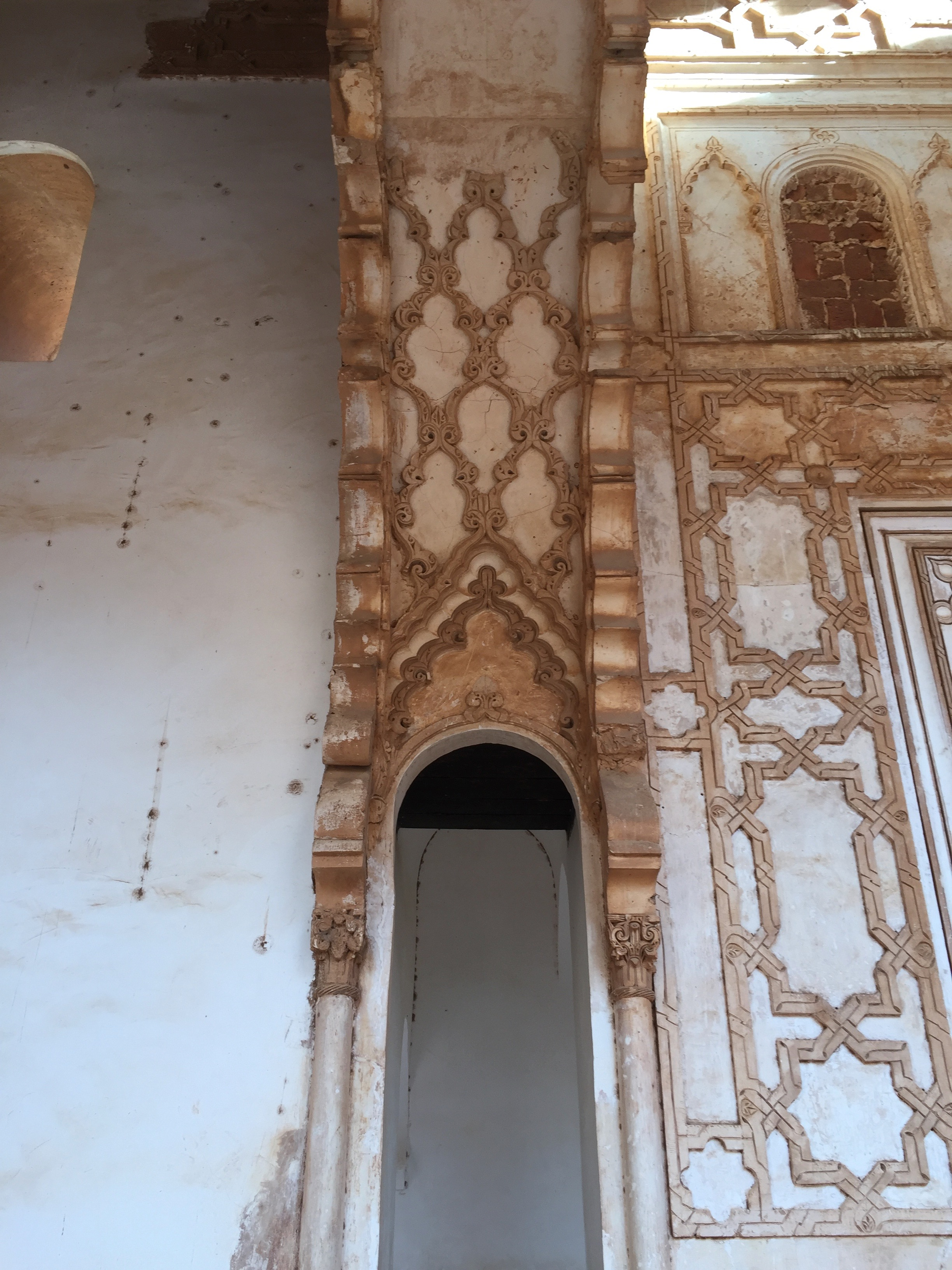
Intrado of the arch (above) next to the mihrab, as well as the opening leading to the imam's entrance (below)

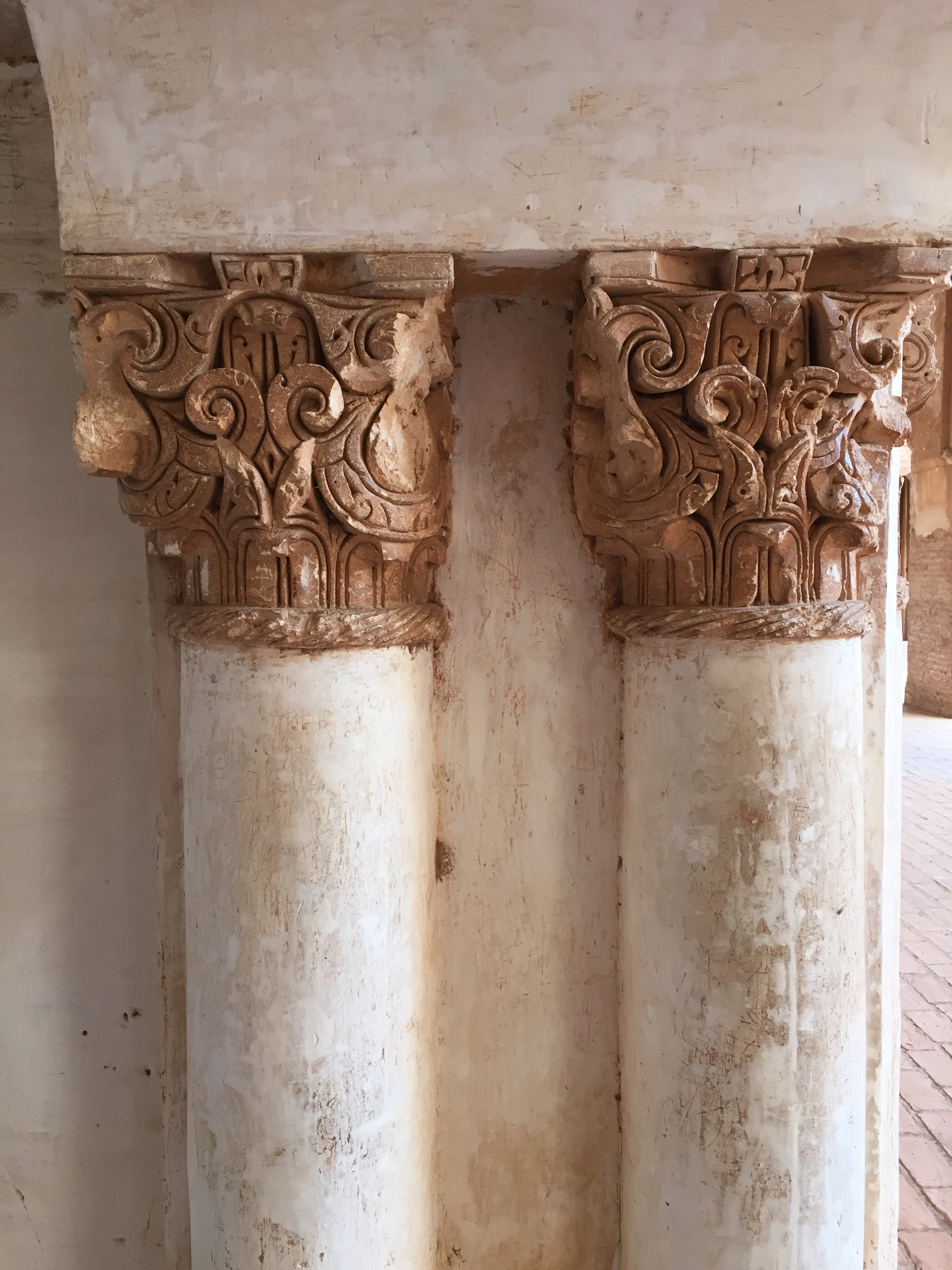
Decorative capitals around the mihrab

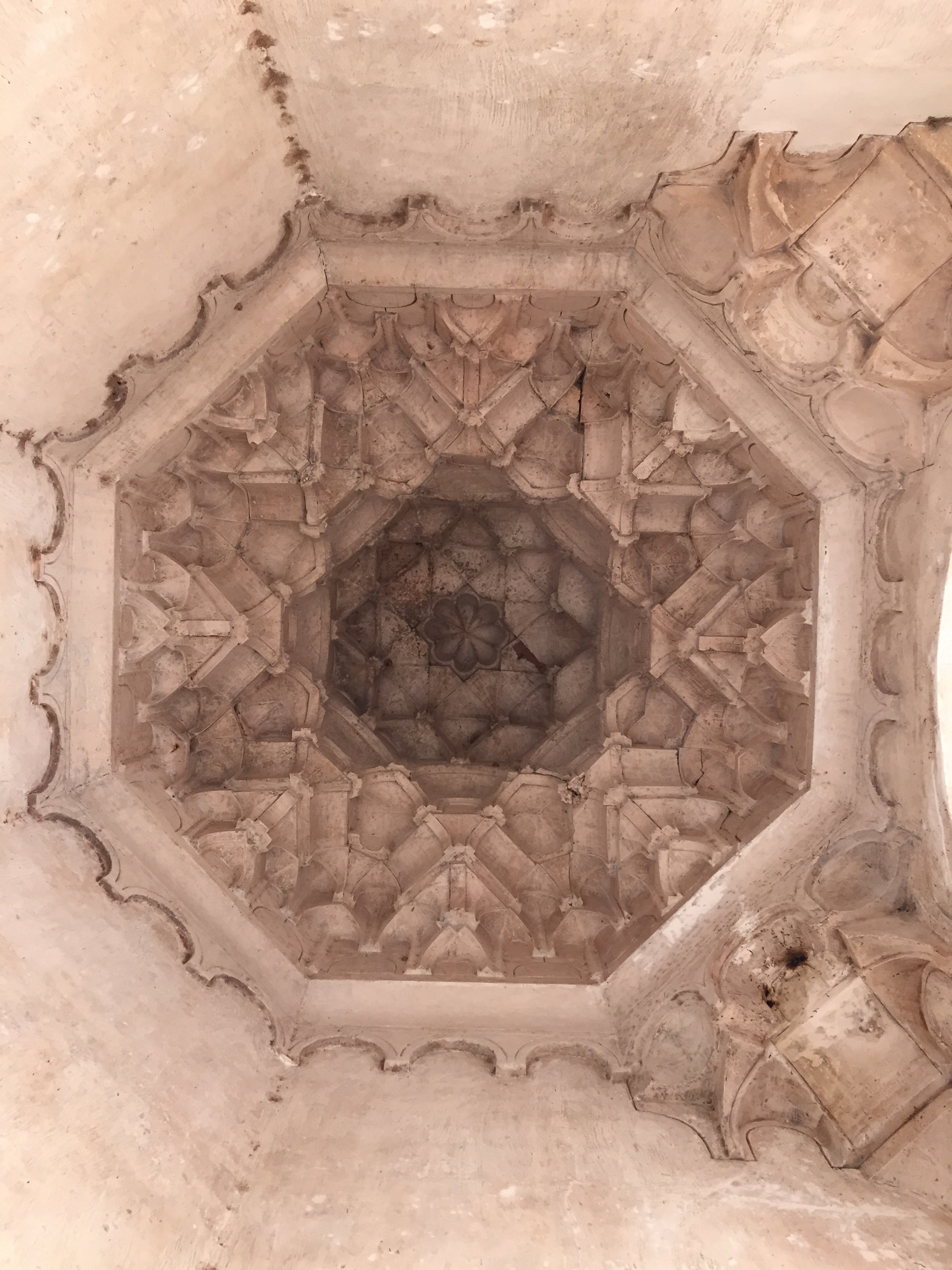
The muqarnas cupola inside the mihrab
