= Ijoukak =

Coordinates: 30.9931°N 8.1528°W

- Rural commune and town
- Interactive map of Ijoukak
- Country: Morocco
- Region: Marrakesh-Tensift-El Haouz
- Province: Al Haouz Province

Population (2004)
  - Total: 6,641
- Time zone: UTC+0 (GMT)

Ijoukak is a small town and rural commune in Al Haouz Province of the Marrakesh-Tensift-El Haouz region of Morocco. At the time of the 2004 census, the commune had a total population of 6641 people living in 1100 households.

An estimated 200 buildings were destroyed in Ijoukak during the 2023 Marrakesh-Safi earthquake.
