= Ouirgane =

- Rural commune and town
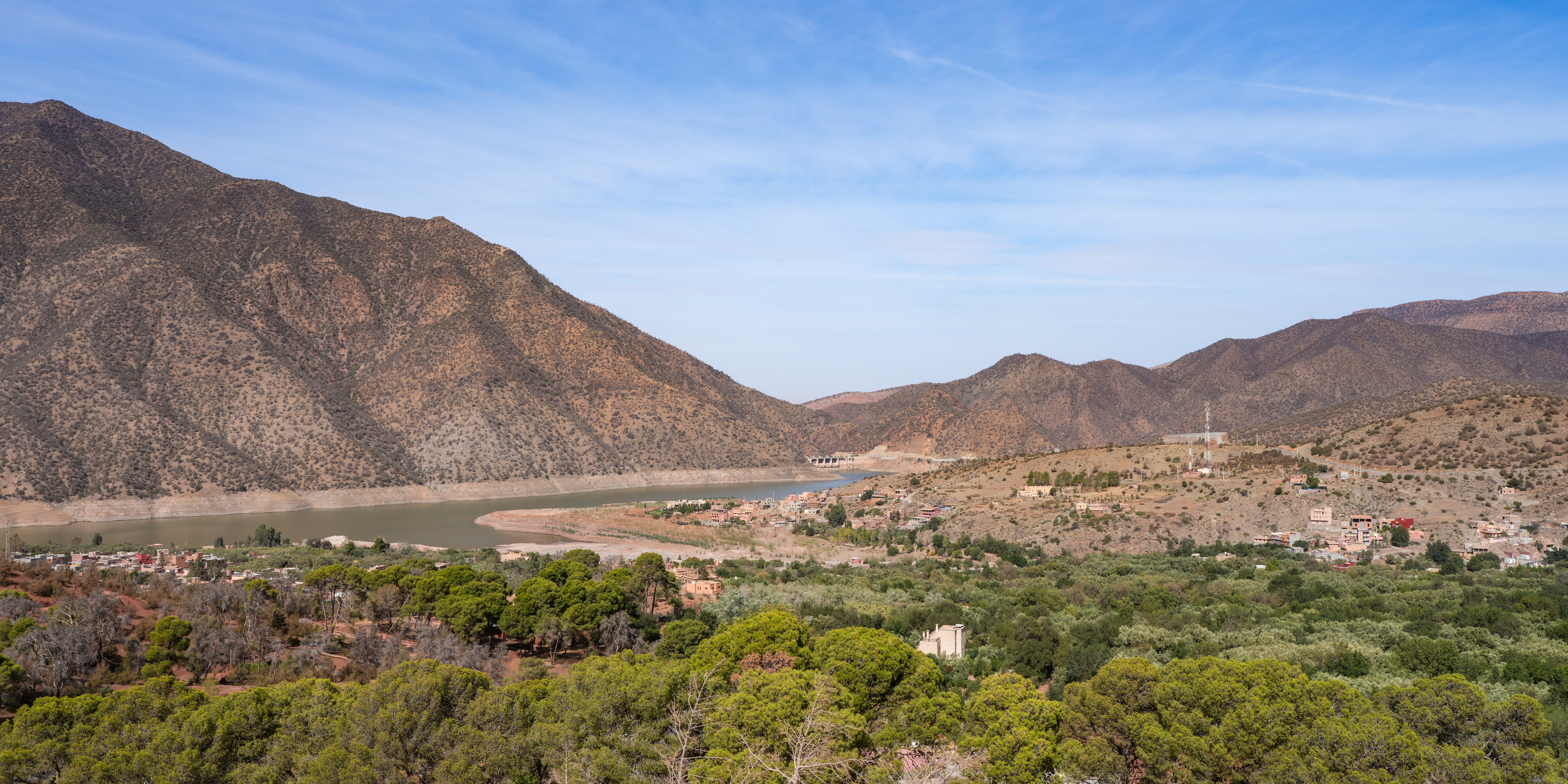
- Ouirgane and Yacoub el Mansour barrage
- Interactive map of Ouirgane
- Coordinates: 31°10′28″N 8°4′44″W
- Country: Morocco
- Region: Marrakesh-Safi
- Province: Al Haouz Province

Population (2024)
  - Total: 7,687
- Time zone: UTC+0 (GMT)

Ouirgane is a small town and rural commune in Al Haouz Province of the Marrakesh-Tensift-El Haouz region of Morocco. At the time of the 2024 census, the commune had a total population of 7,687 people living in 1,830 households. It is a Berber village.

== Geography ==
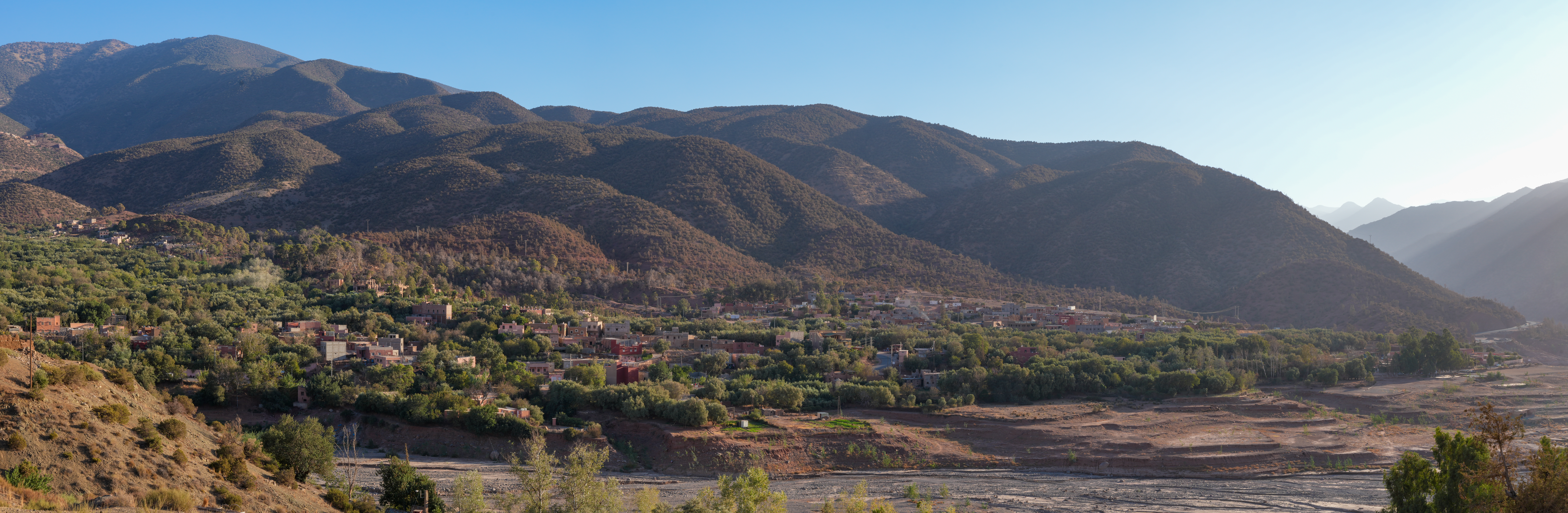
Ouirgane backed by the Atlas Range, view from northwest

Ouirgane is situated in the High Atlas mountains in the heart of the Toubkal National Park at about 1,000 metres (3,300 ft) above sea level. By road it is located 14 kilometres (8.7 mi) southwest of Asni and 65 kilometres (40 mi) south of Marrakesh along the S501 road. The Oued Nfis River flows through the valley of the commune. The village itself lies on the eastern bank of the Yacoub el Mansour reservoir and dam across the Oued Nfis river. The village is set amongst olive trees.

== Landmarks ==
Ouirgane has a souq noted for its Berber pottery, the Tin Mal Mosque, a ruined kasbah, and several salt mines in the vicinity. There are also two notable hotels with facing gardens; a stream near the hotels "drains the western face of Jbel Toubkal". La Roseraie hotel has horse-riding facilities to accommodate the many tourists who visit during the summer months; it also has a health center above the mineral stream. The Auberge au Sanglier qui Fume is a hunter's lodge. Tagadirt n'Bour is constructed of drystone walls and is located 4 kilometres (2.5 mi) south of the village.

== Gallery ==
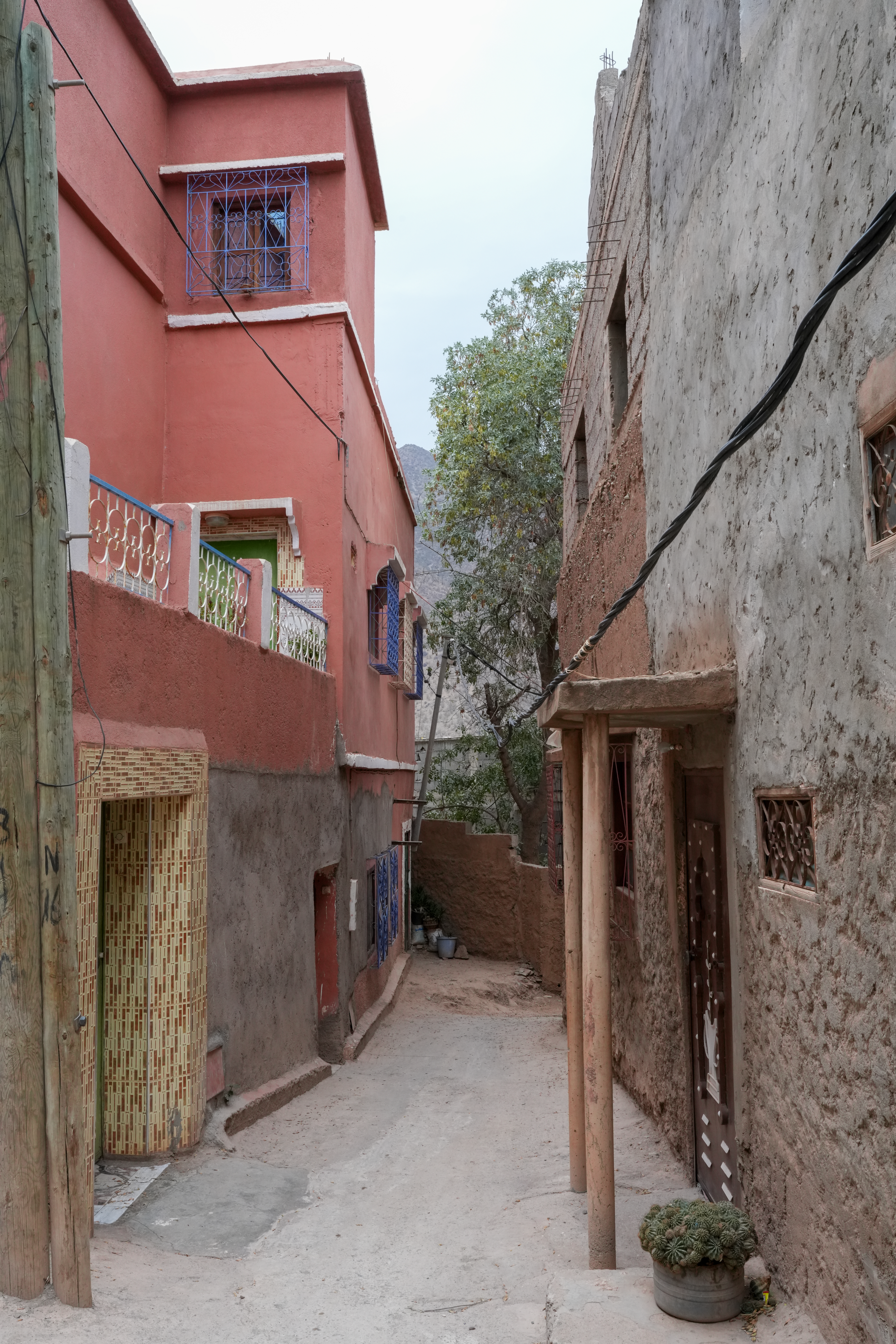
Typical narrow alley

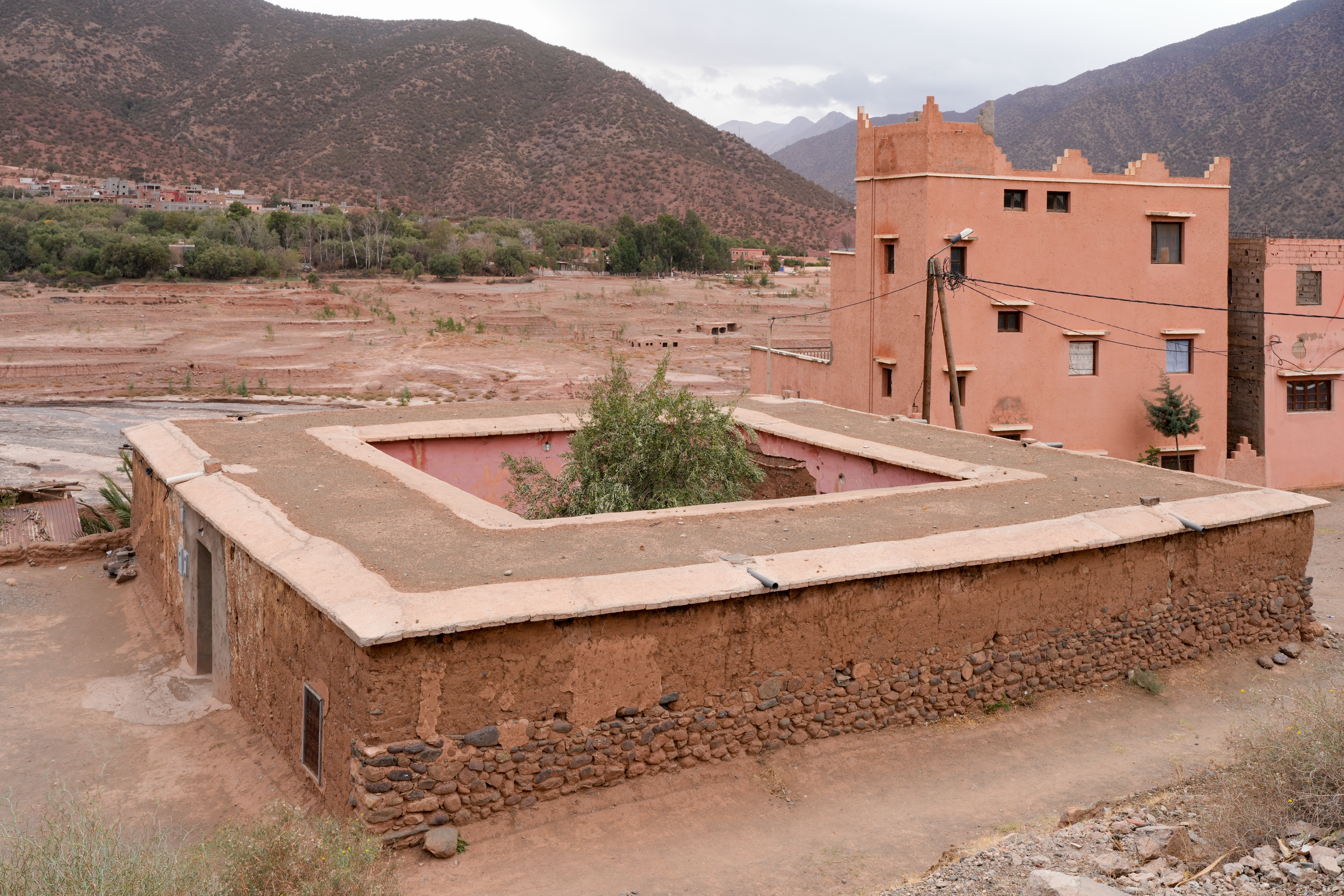
Traditional building with central courtyard

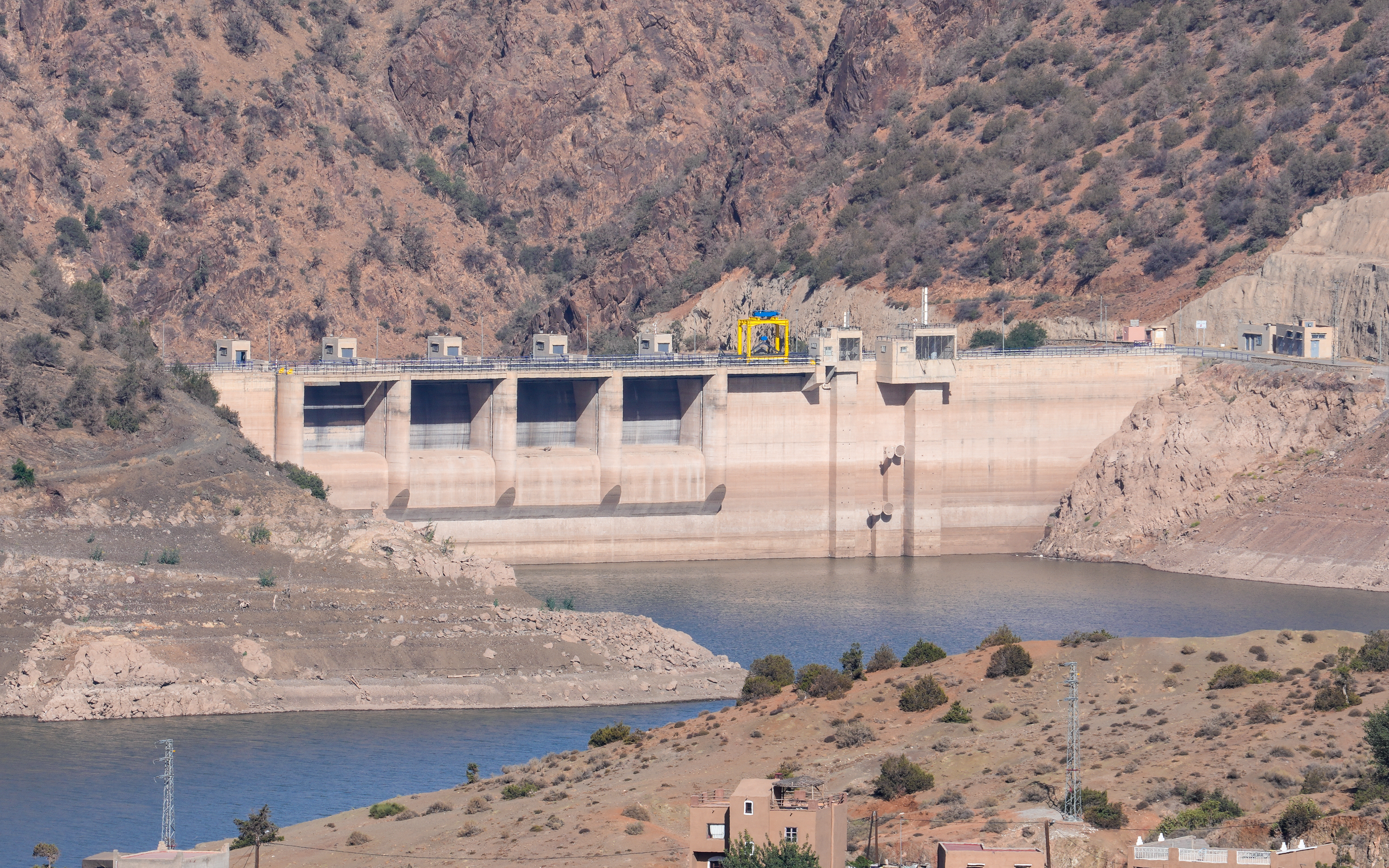
Yacoub el Mansour Dam

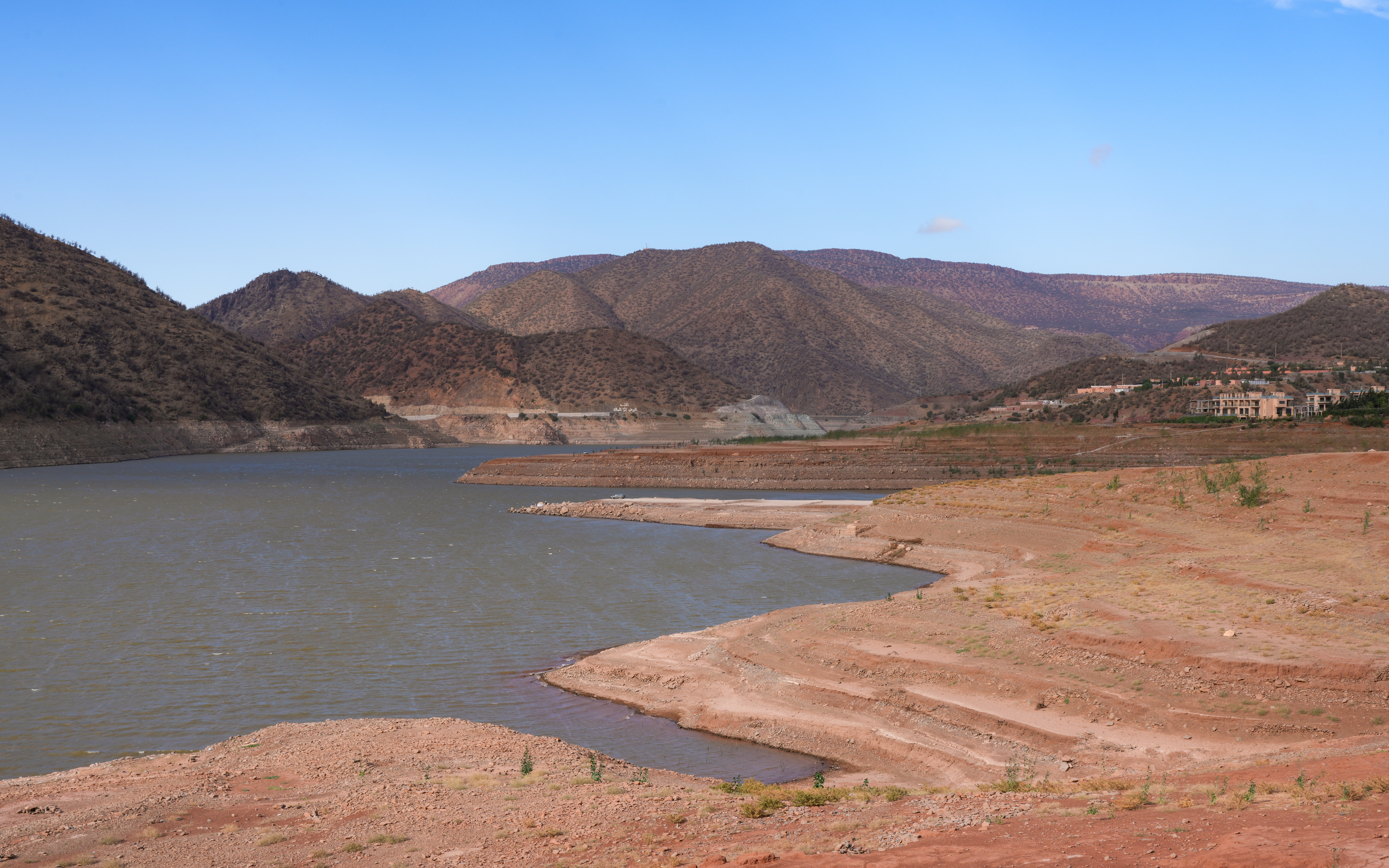
Yacoub el Mansour Reservoir

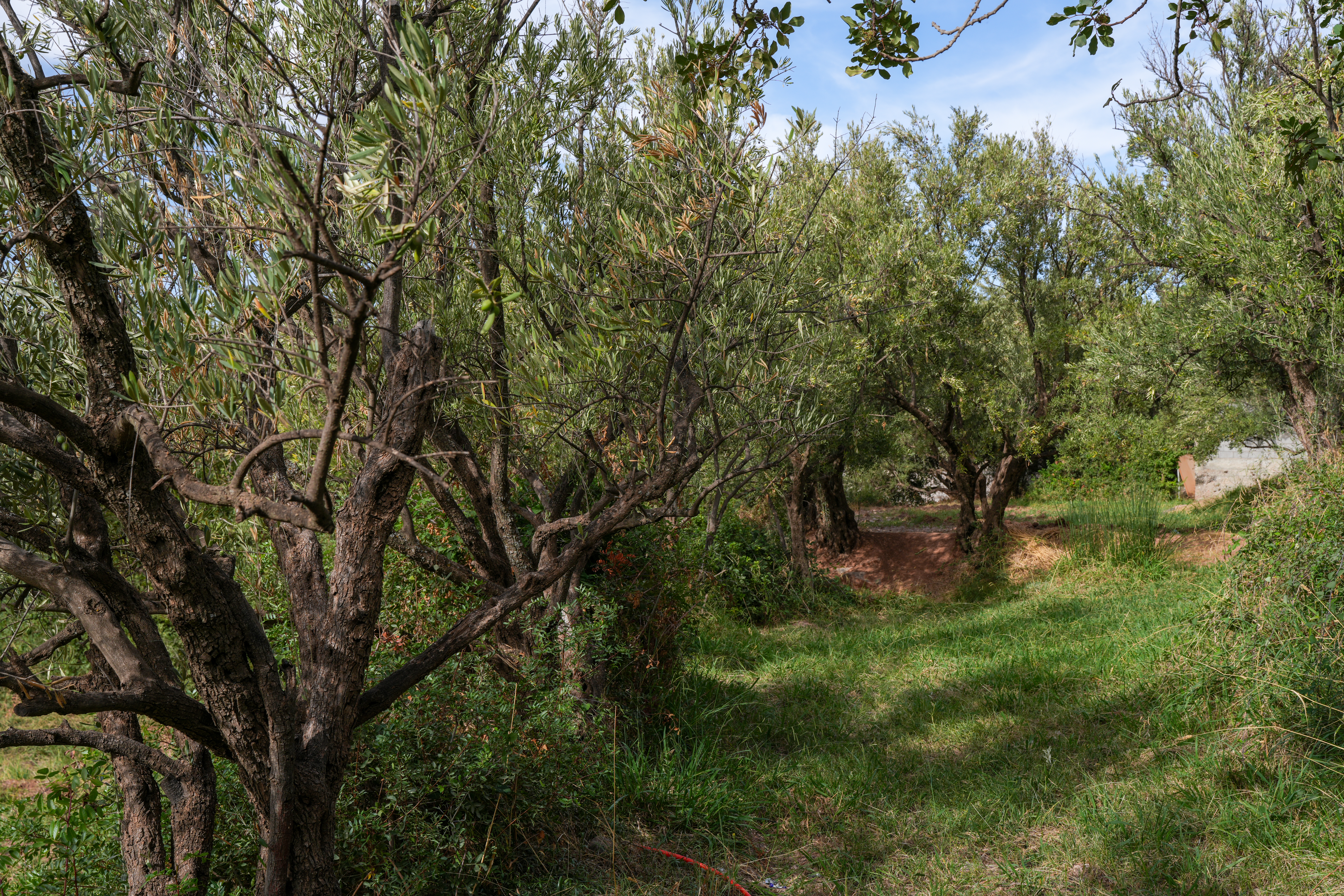
Olive grove

== See also ==
- Yacoub el Mansour Dam
