= Tinmel =

Tinmel / ⵜⵉⵏ ⵎⵍ / تينمل Tin Mal / ⵜⵉⵏ ⵎⴰⵍ
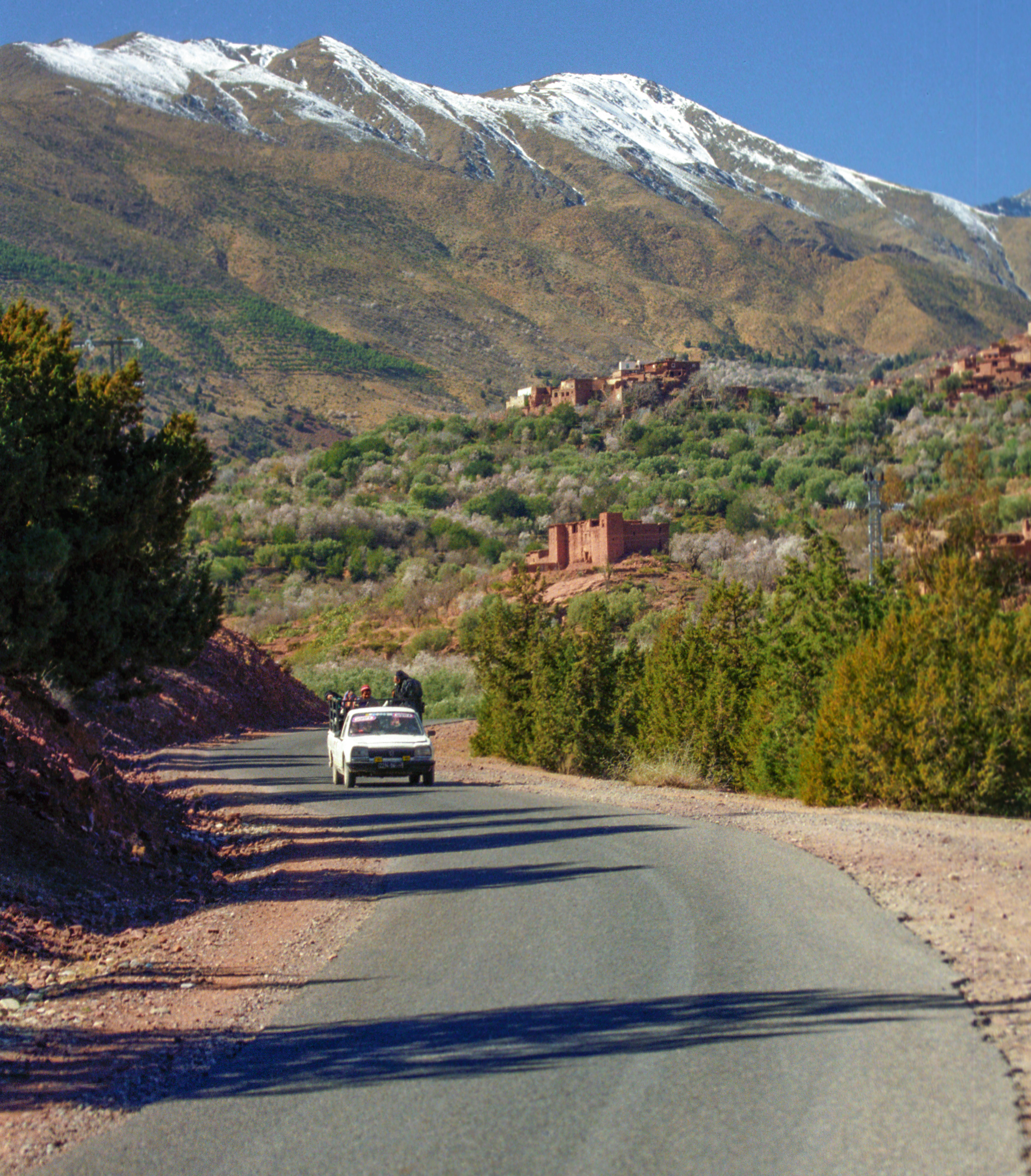
- Tinmel, High Atlas
- Interactive map of Tinmel / ⵜⵉⵏ ⵎⵍ / تينمل
- Coordinates: 30°59′05″N 8°13′43″W
- Country: Morocco
- Region: Marrakesh-Safi
- Province: Al Haouz
- Commune: Talat N'Yaaqoub
- Time zone: UTC+0 (GMT)

Tinmel (Berber: Tin Mel or Tin Mal, Arabic: تينمل) is a small mountain village in the High Atlas 100 km from Marrakesh, Morocco. it is a part of the Talat N'Yaaqoub commune of Al Haouz Province. Tinmel was the cradle of the Berber Almohad empire, from where the Almohads started their military campaigns against the Almoravids in the early 12th century.

== History ==
With the seizure of Marrakesh in 1147, Tinmel became the spiritual capital and the artistic centre of the Almohad Caliphate. The village is home to the tombs of the Almohad rulers. In Tinmel, the Almohad dirham, symbol of its economic prosperity, was struck.

== Tinmal Mosque ==
The Tinmal Mosque is a mosque located in the High Atlas mountains of North Africa. It was built in 1156 to commemorate the founder of the Almohad dynasty, Mohamed Ibn Tumart. The edifice is one of the two mosques in Morocco open to non-Muslims, the other being the Hassan II Mosque in Casablanca. The prototype for the Tinmal mosque was the Great Mosque of Taza, also built by Abd al-Mu'min. The Koutoubia Mosque in Marrakesh was in its turn modelled on it.

On 8 September 2023 a powerful earthquake crumbled the mosque’s intricate domes and graceful arches. A team of archaeologists, historians and engineers had nearly finished months of work restoring the mosque set deep in the mountains of Morocco.

== World Heritage Status ==
The Tinmel mosque was added to the UNESCO World Heritage Tentative List on 1 July 1995 in the Cultural category.

Tin Mal Mosque

== Sources ==
- Basset, H.; Henri Terrasse (1932). Sanctuaires et fortresses almohades. Paris.
