= Ibn Jalal al-Tilimsani =

Scholar and Mufti from Tlemcen

- ابن جلال التلمساني
- Born: 1502; Tlemcen
- Died: 1574 (aged 71–72); Fez
- Occupations: Scholar, Teacher, Mufti

Ibn Jalal al-Tilimsani (in Arabic: ابن جلال التلمساني) was a Muslim scholar born in Tlemcen around 1502–1503 and died in Fez around 1573–1574. Renowned for his expertise in both religious and secular sciences, he served as a mufti in Tlemcen before relocating to Fez due to the city’s political instability. His move was also influenced by the Saadians, who admired his knowledge and sought his presence.

In Fez, Ibn Jalal taught at the Mosque of the Andalusians, al-Qarawiyyin, and the Great Mosque of Taroudant, passing on his vast knowledge to numerous scholars of the region until his death.

== Biography ==
Abu Abdullah Muhammad ibn Abd al-Rahman ibn Ahmad ibn Abd al-Rahman ibn Jalal al-Maghrawi al-Tilimsani, known as Ibn Jalal Tilimsani, was born in Tlemcen in 908 AH (1502–1503 CE). He grew up acquiring a profound education in religious and secular sciences, studying under many notable scholars, including Abi Abdullah Muhammad ibn Musa, a jurist of Tlemcen, and Abu Othman Saïd ibn Ahmad al-Maqqari, uncle of the famous historian Ahmad al-Maqqari.

He also studied under Abu al-Abbas Ahmad ibn Ata Allah, a disciple of Ibn Ghazi al-Miknasi, and expanded his expertise in tafsir under Abi Marwan Abd al-Malik al-Burji. Ibn Jalal benefited from the teachings of the Sufi disciples of Mohamed ibn Youssef Sanoussi and Ahmed Ben Youssef al-Malliani, whom his father often associated with, along with other prominent scholars of the Maghreb referenced in Belkacem El Hafnaoui’s works.

Ibn Jalal excelled in various disciplines, including theology, fiqh (Islamic jurisprudence), logic, tafsir (Quranic exegesis), hadith, and literature.

Initially, Ibn Jalal served as a mufti in Tlemcen. However, the political unrest—characterized by internal Zianid conflicts, discontent among locals over the Ottoman presence, and pressure from the Saadians—prompted many scholars, including Shaqroun Al-Wajdiji al-Tilimsani, to leave the city. Faced with such turmoil, Ibn Jalal exiled himself to Fez in 958 AH (1551 CE) during the reign of the Saadian Sultan Mohammed al-Shaykh, who highly esteemed his erudition.

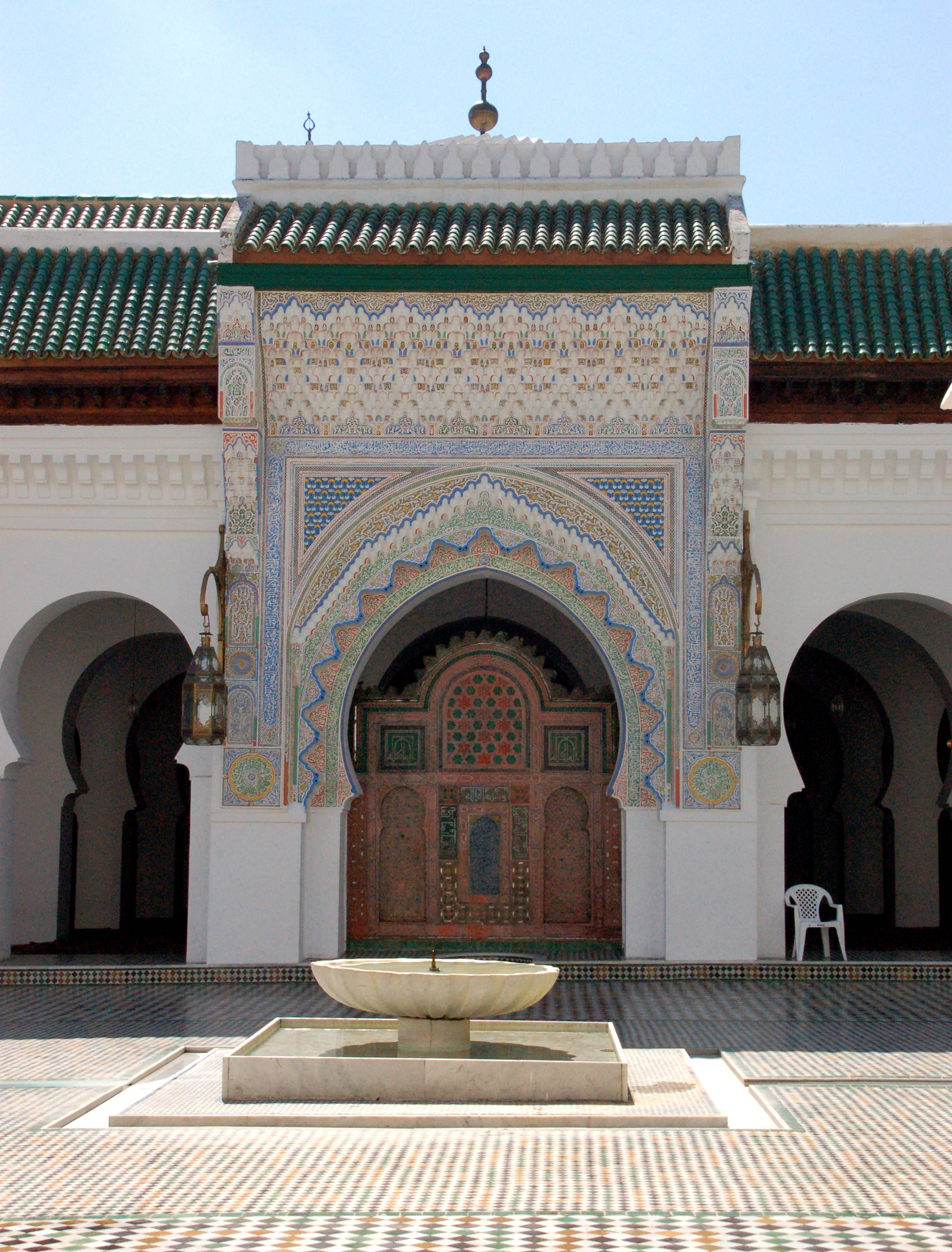
The Al-Qaraouiyine mosque in Fez where he taught.

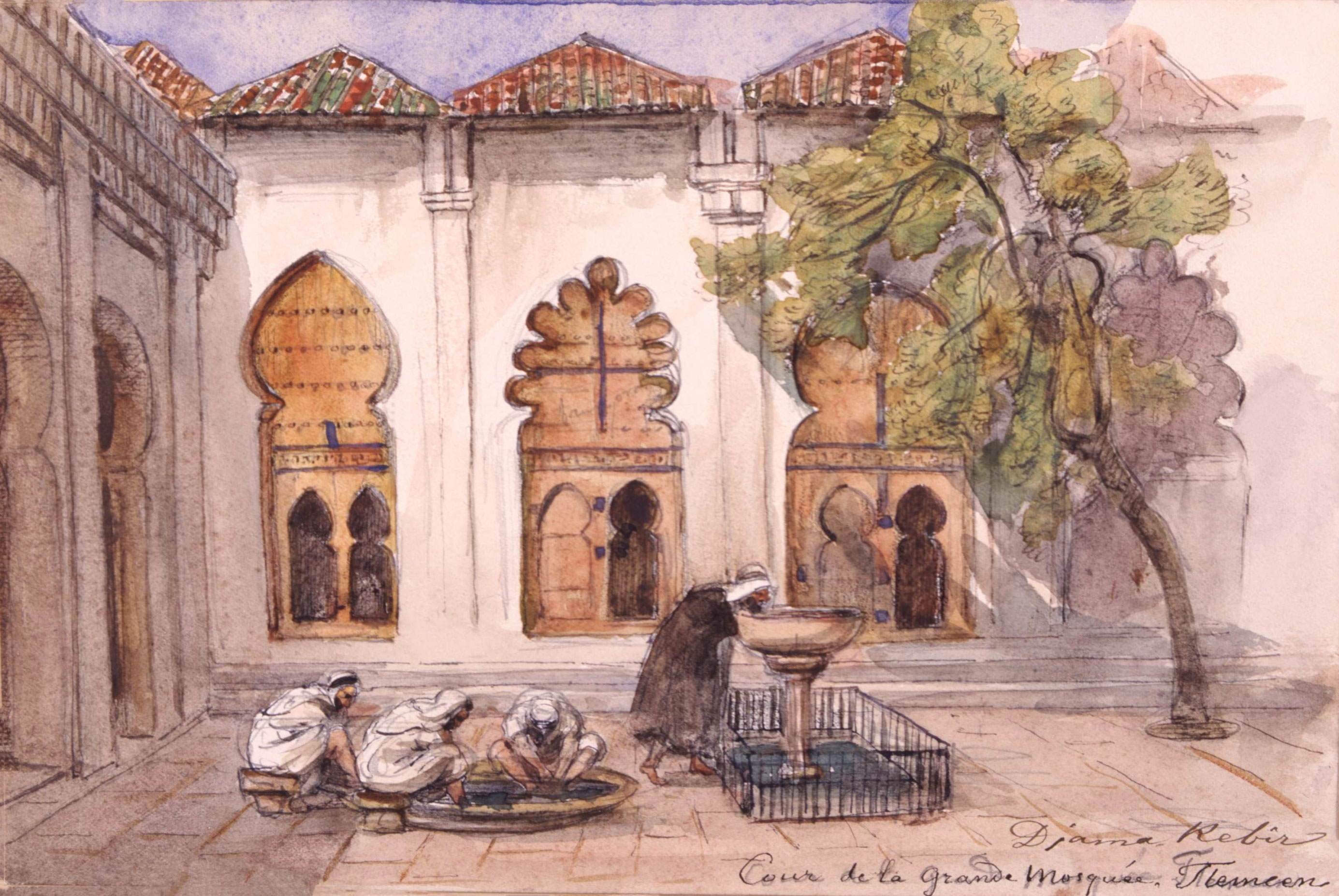
Watercolor, representing the Great Mosque of Tlemcen, his hometown.

In Fez, Ibn Jalal was appointed as a mufti, teacher, and khatib (preacher) at the Mosque of the Andalusians, a role he held for eight years, followed by thirteen years at al-Qarawiyyin. He taught a wide range of disciplines, including jurisprudence, tafsir, logic, theology, and kalām (Islamic doctrines). His reputation attracted scholars from cities like Marrakech, eager to benefit from his teachings.

One of his notable students, Ahmed al-Mandjur, a scholar from Fez, described him as follows: "He was a monotheistic jurist, an erudite scholar, a mufti, and a preacher. He instructed me in jurisprudence, theology, hadith, literature, and other fields. He possessed dignity, serenity, great ambition, and generosity."

According to Abd al-Rahman al-Tamanarti, the qadi of Taroudant, Ibn Jalal accompanied the Saadian Sultan Abdallah al-Ghalib to Souss in 970 AH (1562 CE). He spent a year teaching at the Great Mosque of Taroudant, where numerous jurists benefited from his lessons.

The historian and qadi Abu Abdallah ibn Askar of Chefchaouen met Ibn Jalal several times and mentioned him in his works documenting the scholars of the Maghreb al-Aqsa, attesting to his knowledge.

Ibn Jalal continued teaching until his death in Fez on 8 Ramadan 981 AH (January 2, 1574 CE). Other sources suggest he died earlier in 980 AH (January 12, 1573 CE) and that his tomb is near the tomb of Sultan Abdallah El-Ghalib. Ibn Jalal’s son Mohamed al-Mourabit followed in his footsteps, becoming a khatib at the Mosque of the Andalusians and Al Quaraouiyine.

In 2004, while examining an old manuscript at the Manuscript Laboratory of Oran, the Algerian searcher Mohammed Ben Amer discovered that Ibn Jallal had a daughter who was married to Ahmad al-Maqqari. The manuscript did not specify whether the marriage took place in Fez or Tlemcen. This revelation indicated that Ahmad al-Maqqari had three wives, rather than the previously believed two.

== See also ==
- Shaqroun Al-Wajdiji al-Tilimsani
- Ahmed al-Maqqari
