= Abd al-Aziz al-Fishtali =

Moroccan state official and poet (1549–1621)

- Born: 1549 CE
- Died: 1621 CE
- Occupations: Historian, Poet, Secretary of State

Academic work
- Era: Saadian dynasty
- Main interests: History, Poetry
- Notable works: Manahil al-safa fi ma'athir mawalina al-shurafa

Abd al-Aziz al-Fishtali (Arabic: عبد العزيز الفشتالي) (1549 – 1621), fully Abu Faris 'Abd al-'Aziz ibn Muhammad ibn Ibrahim al-Sanhaji al-Fishtali was a Moroccan writer, head of the chancery (wazīr al-ḳalam al-aʿlā), official historiographer and official poet of the Sultan Ahmad al-Mansur.

== Biography ==
Abd al-Aziz was a member of the Fishtala tribe, a Berber Sanhaja tribe situated north of the city of Fez. He studied under teachers such as Abu al-Abbas al-Manjur, al-Humaydi and al-Zammuri. He composed most of the pieces of verse which were engraved, on marble or wood, on the façades and inside the pavilions of the El Badii Palace in Marrakech. His friend and biographer, the historian al-Maqqari, recognized in him the greatest poet of his time and reported that the Moroccan sultan, Ahmad al-Mansur, said: "al-Fishtali made us more illustrious than all the other princes of the earth. We can compare him to Lisan ed-Din Ibn al-Khatib."

== Works ==
al-Fishtali wrote 69 poems, numbering 1016 verses.

Some of his works are:

- Manahil al-safa fi ma'athir mawalina al-shurafa (مناهل الصفا في أخبار الملوك الشرفا), the one surviving work of al-Fishtali, as the chief scribe of al-Mansur's state. It is considered to be the main source of information for the dynasty of Ahmad al-Mansur.
- Tartīb Dīwān al-Mutanabbī
- Madad al-Jaysh, a postscript for Ibn al-Khatib's Jaysh al-tawshīḥ
