= Mausoleum of Moulay Ismail =

Historic monument in Meknes, Morocco

Mausoleum of Moulay Isma'il
- ضريح المولى إسماعيل (Arabic)
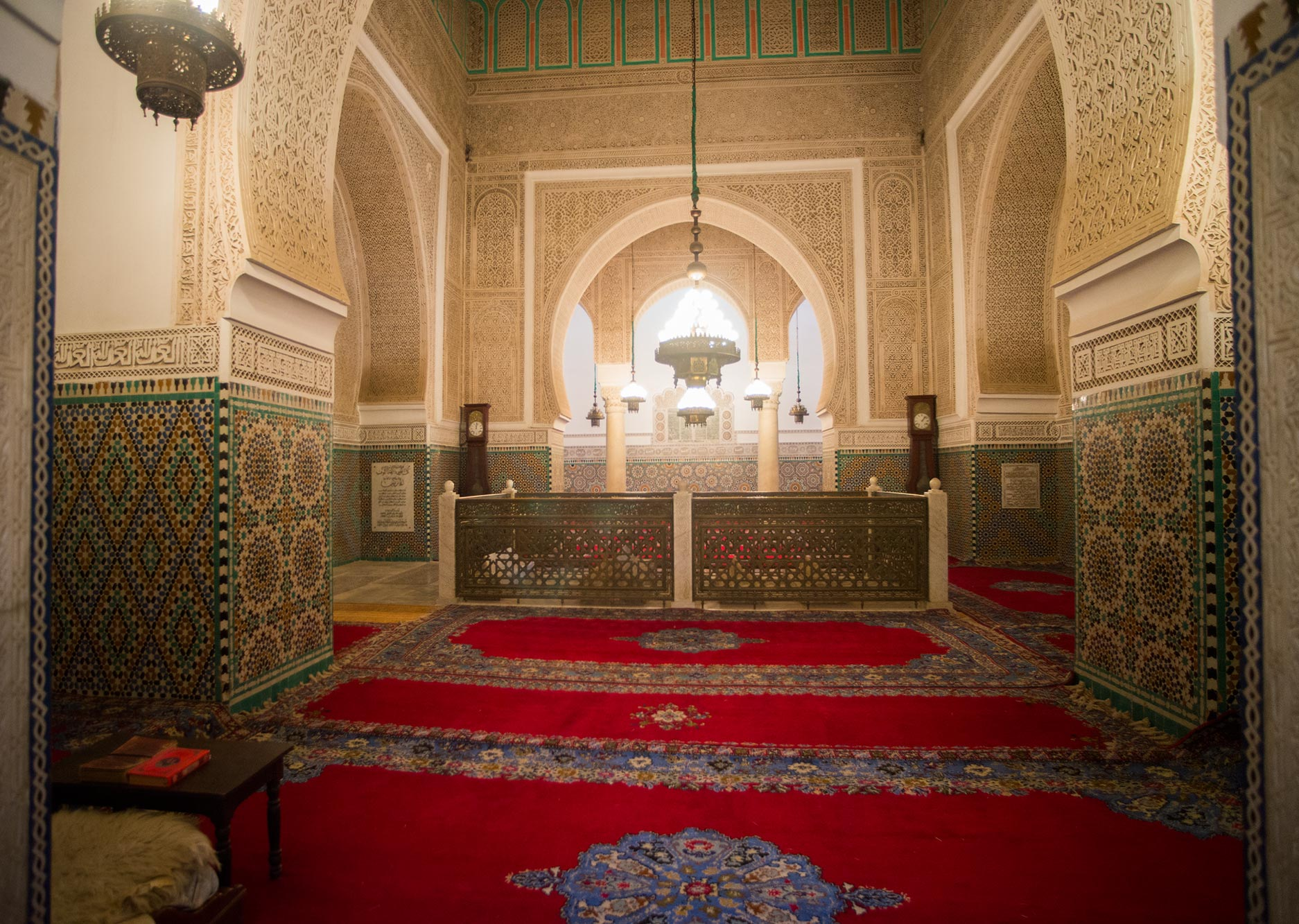
- View into the tomb chamber of Moulay Isma'il
- Interactive map of Mausoleum of Moulay Isma'il
- 33°53′27.6″N 5°33′46.6″W
- Type: mausoleum, cemetery
- Location: Meknes, Morocco

History
- Founder: Moulay Isma'il
- Built: 1703 (modified between 1727 and 1729)

Site notes
- Architectural styles: 'Alawi, Moroccan, Moorish
- Current use: historic site, mosque, & tourist attraction

The Mausoleum of Moulay Isma'il (Arabic: ضريح المولى إسماعيل) is a historic Islamic funerary complex in Meknes, Morocco. It contains the tomb of Sultan Moulay Isma'il, who ruled Morocco from 1672 until his death in 1727, and is located inside his former Kasbah (citadel). It is a major historic and religious site in the city.

== History ==
=== Context: Moulay Isma'il's reign ===
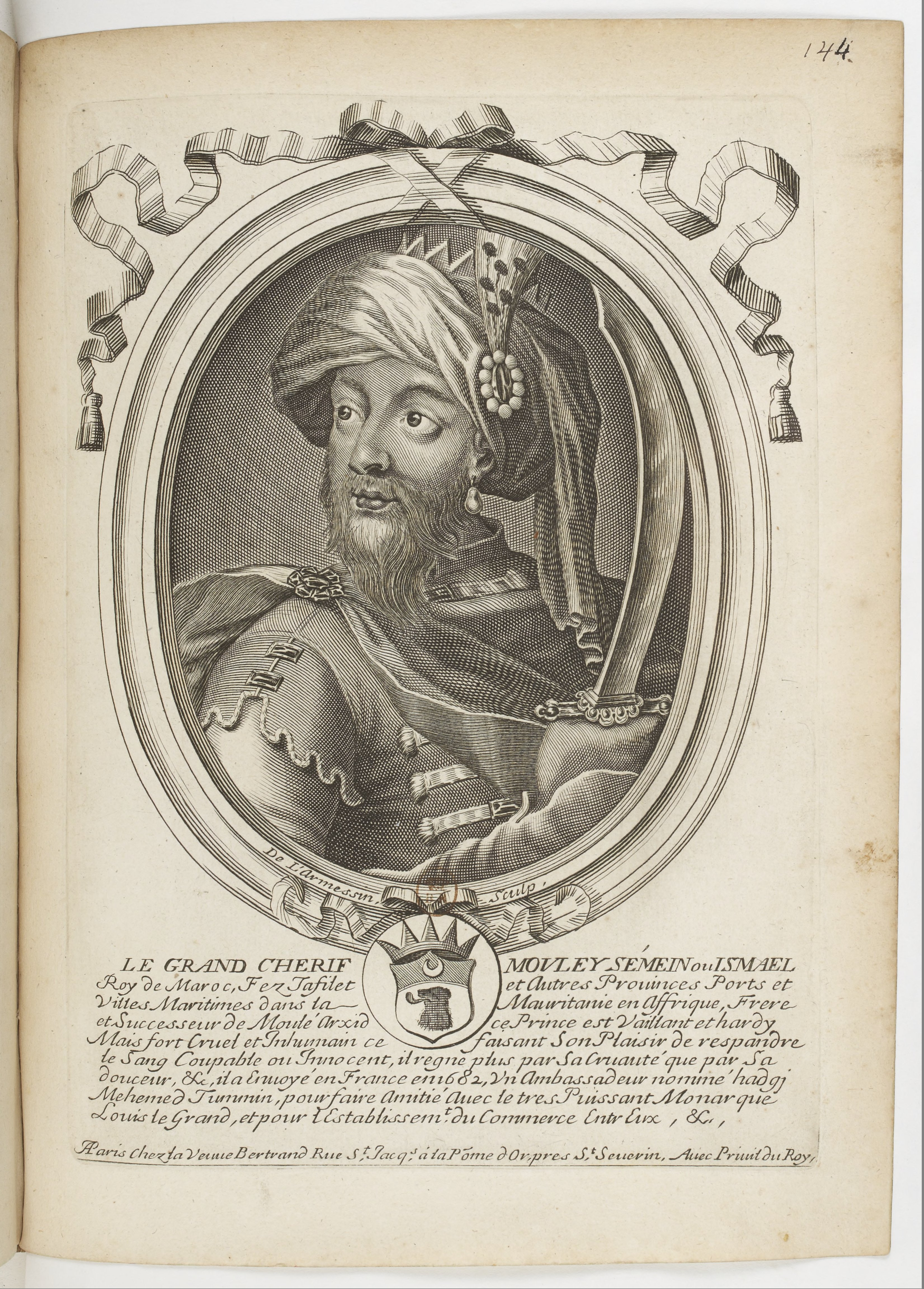
A portrait of Moulay Isma'il in a French manuscript from 1690

Moulay Isma'il became sultan upon the death of his brother Moulay Rashid in 1672. Breaking with tradition, he chose to make Meknes as his capital. Here, he built a monumental imperial palace-city (kasbah) on the southwest side of the old city (the medina). It consisted of several distinct palace complexes and other facilities spread across a vast area enclosed by fortified walls.

As sultan, Isma'il's 55-year reign was one of longest in Moroccan history. He distinguished himself as a ruler who wished to establish a unified Moroccan state as the absolute authority in the land, independent of any particular group within Morocco – in contrast to previous dynasties which relied on certain tribes or regions as the base of their power. He succeeded in part by creating a new army composed of Black slaves (the 'Abid al-Bukhari) from Sub-Saharan Africa (or descendants of previously imported slaves), many of them Muslims, whose loyalty was to him alone. Isma'il himself was half Black, his mother having been a Black slave. He also continuallly led military campaigns against rebels, rivals, and European positions along the Moroccan coast. In practice, he still had to rely on various groups to control outlying areas, but he nonetheless succeeded in retaking many coastal cities occupied by England and Spain and managed to enforce order and heavy taxation throughout his territories. He put a definitive end to Ottoman attempts to gain influence in Morocco and established Morocco on more equal diplomatic footing with European powers in part by forcing them to ransom Christian captives at his court. These Christians were mostly captured by Moroccan pirate fleets which he heavily sponsored as a means of both revenue and warfare. While in captivity, prisoners were often forced into labour on his construction projects. All of these activities and policies gave him a reputation for ruthlessness and cruelty among European writers and a mixed reputation among Moroccan historians as well, though he is credited with unifying Morocco under strong (but brutal) leadership.

=== The Kasbah ===
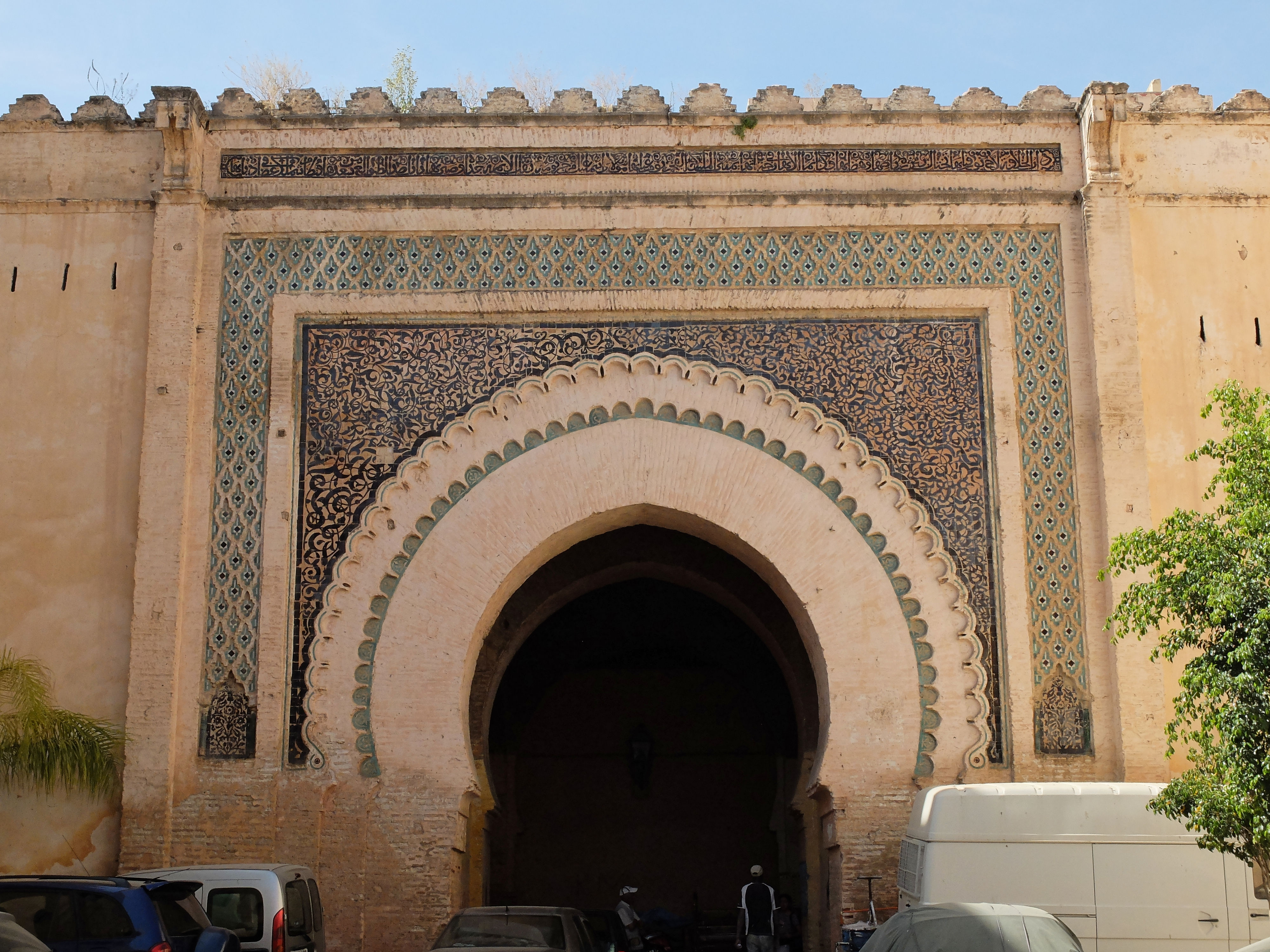
The gate of the Dar al-Kebira palace, still located near the mausoleum today

Moulay Ismail constructed the kasbah as a demonstration of his power and as a means to stand out from previous Moroccan rulers. The complex contained three main palaces – Dar al-Kebira, Dar al-Madrasa, and Ksar al-Mhanncha – and other features such as gardens and reservoirs. The earliest of these palaces was the Dar al-Kebira, located in the northern part of the kasbah and finished in 1679. It was adjoined by the Lalla Aouda Mosque, which Moulay Isma'il also built (or rebuilt) around this time. This palace is where Ismail's mausoleum is located. Though the palace itself was not able to withstand the centuries since its construction, the mausoleum has been maintained to this day. Since the kasbah was also a residence for the family of Sultan Ismail to live, the Dar al-Kebira palace also included functional services for recreation such as courtyards and rooms to entertain. The kasbah was lavishly decorated in the style of Moroccan architecture. Though Moulay Ismail was wealthy and put much of his own money into its construction, he also stole from other palaces, such as the Badi palace, for his palace complex. Items plundered from the Badi Palace included different types of wood, ivory and ceramic tiles.

=== Development of the mausoleum ===
The mausoleum is located on the southwest side of the former Dar al-Kebira Palace, in a space that was formerly between the inner and outer perimeter walls of the palace. Moulay Isma'il chose this location in part because it was already considered sanctified by the presence of the tomb of Sidi 'Abd ar-Rahman al-Majdub, a 16th-century poet and Sufi mystic. The complex was first built in 1703 under Moulay Isma'il, but was modified and expanded multiple times, in particular under his son and brief successor, Ahmad ad-Dhahabi (who ruled, with interruptions, between 1727 and 1729), who was in turn buried here afterwards. Sultan Moulay Abd ar-Rahman, who died in 1859, was also buried here later.

The funerary complex was originally entered from the north, directly from the Dar al-Kebira palace. The current entrance to the south dates from the French protectorate period in the 20th century. The original complex was less extensive than it is today and its plan likely included only the tomb chamber, the adjoining rooms on either side of it, and the main courtyard leading up to it. The other courtyards and passages were thus likely added later. The mausoleum is still visited today by Moroccans seeking baraka from Moulay Isma'il's tomb, in addition to being a significant tourist attraction in the city.

== Architecture and layout ==
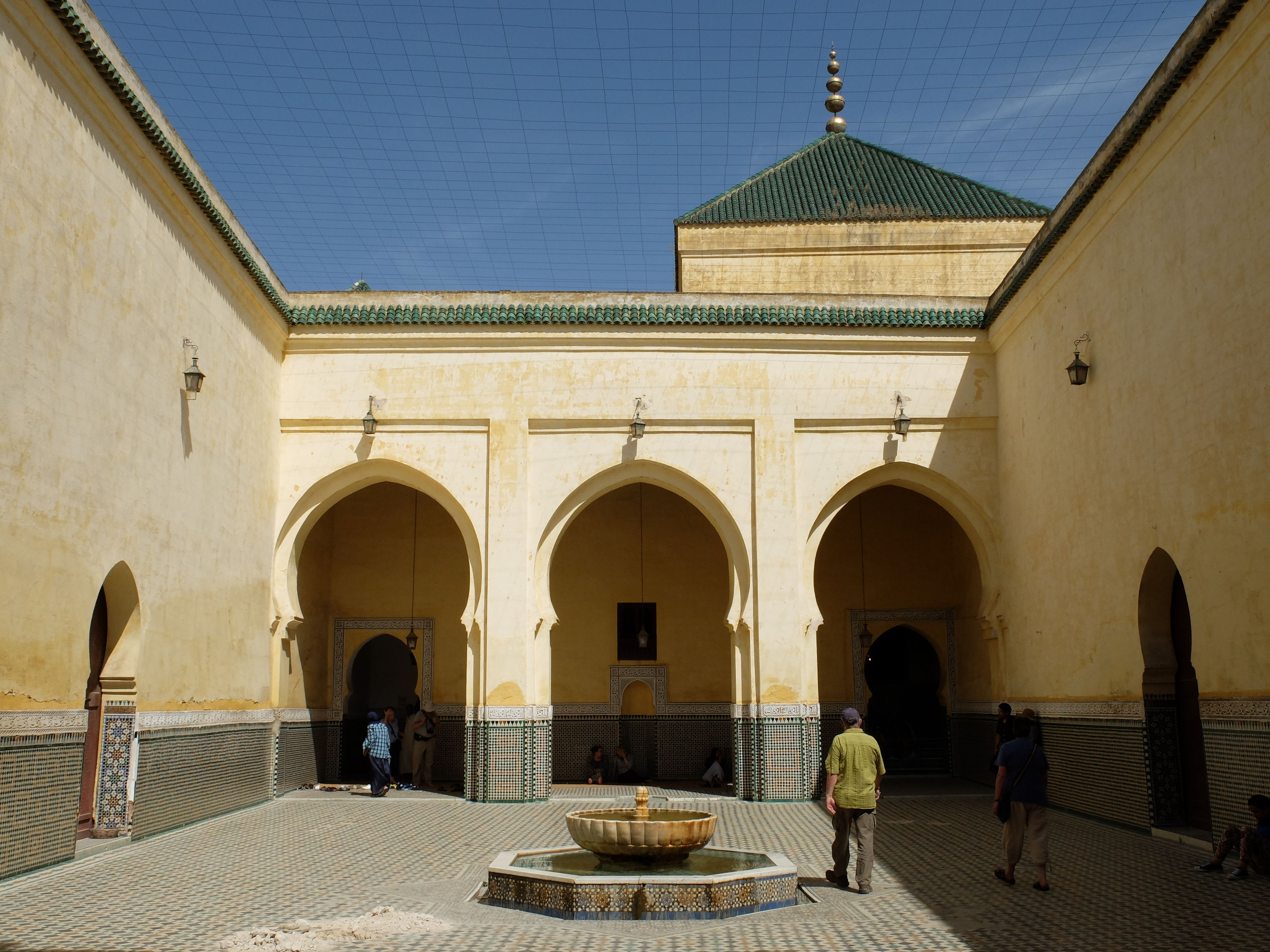
Main courtyard next to the mausoleum (looking east; cupola of the tomb chamber visible in the upper right)

The funerary complex consists of various courtyards and chambers. The main central courtyard, located on the west side of the tomb chamber, is sparsely decorated except for a central fountain and zellij pavement. The western and eastern sides of the courtyard are occupied by porticoes of three horseshoe arches. The eastern wall of the courtyard, in front of the mausoleum, also features a small mihrab (niche indicating the direction of prayer).

Behind the courtyard's eastern wall are the mausoleum chamber and adjoining rooms. The northernmost of these rooms, which can be accessed directly from the northeastern corner of the courtyard, consists of an indoor patio or courtyard covered by a high cupola ceiling. The layout of this patio is similar to the Chamber of the Twelve Columns in the Saadian Tombs, consisting of a square delineated by twelve marble columns arranged in groups of three at each corner, around which runs a gallery space. Another mihrab is set into the eastern wall, while a small side-chamber is set into the western wall. The pavement and lower walls are decorated with zellij tilework that feature circular or radiating geometric patterns, typical of Moroccan architecture. The upper walls and the areas around the mihrab and doorways are decorated with carved and painted stucco featuring arabesque and epigraphic motifs also typical of Moroccan architecture. At the center of the patio is an ornate fountain, and while the cupola ceiling above primarily features painted and carved wood. The cupola is high enough to allow for windows that bring in natural light. The marble columns feature Moroccan-Andalusian capitals carved with leaf, palm, and palmette motifs. These marble columns, as well as the ornately carved marble panels in the archway leading to the mausoleum antechamber, are believed to be spolia taken by Moulay Isma'il from the former Saadian palaces of in the Kasbah of Marrakesh (such as the Badi Palace).

On the south side of the patio chamber is a large archway with ornate wooden doors which leads to a rectangular antechamber which precedes the actual mausoleum chamber. The mausoleum is a square chamber which holds the tombstones (mqabriyas) of Moulay Isma'il (died 1727), his son and successor Ahmad ad-Dhahabi (died 1729), and the later sultan Moulay Abd ar-Rahman ibn Hisham (died 1859). On the south side of the mausoleum is another large reading room divided by a triple-arched arcade and containing book cabinets. Each of these chambers is covered with zellij tiles featuring geometric patterns along the lower walls and more carved stucco decoration on the upper walls. They also hold several bronze chandeliers. The royal tombstones are made of marble and are richly carved with Arabic calligraphic inscriptions and arabesque motifs in a style similar to the marble tombstones of the Saadian Tombs. The tomb chamber also holds two grandfather clocks which were gifts from King Louis XIV of France. Other enclosures and courtyards adjacent to the complex are occupied by cemeteries known as the Jama' Rkham.

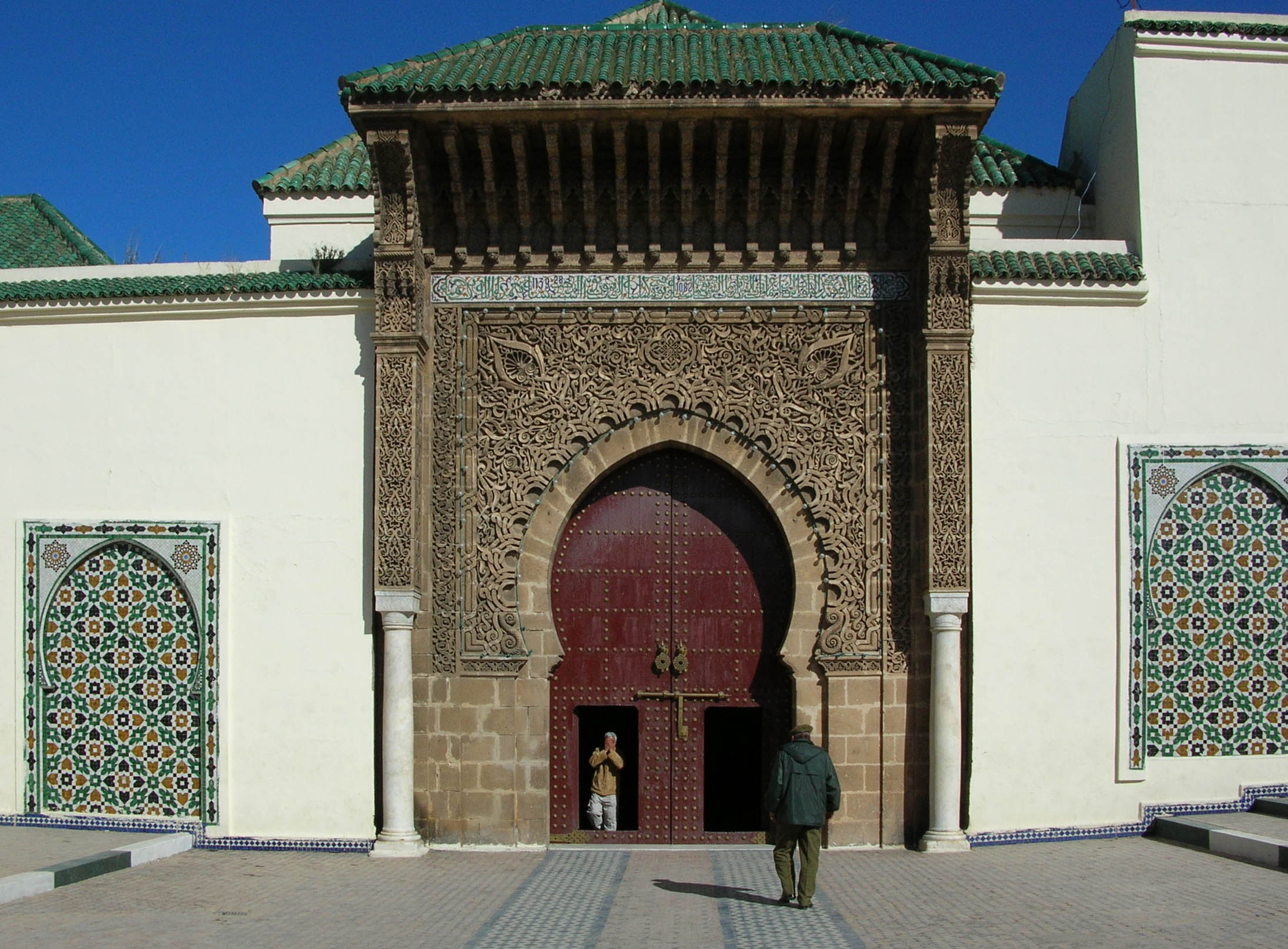
The main entrance of the funerary complex today, off a main street to the south

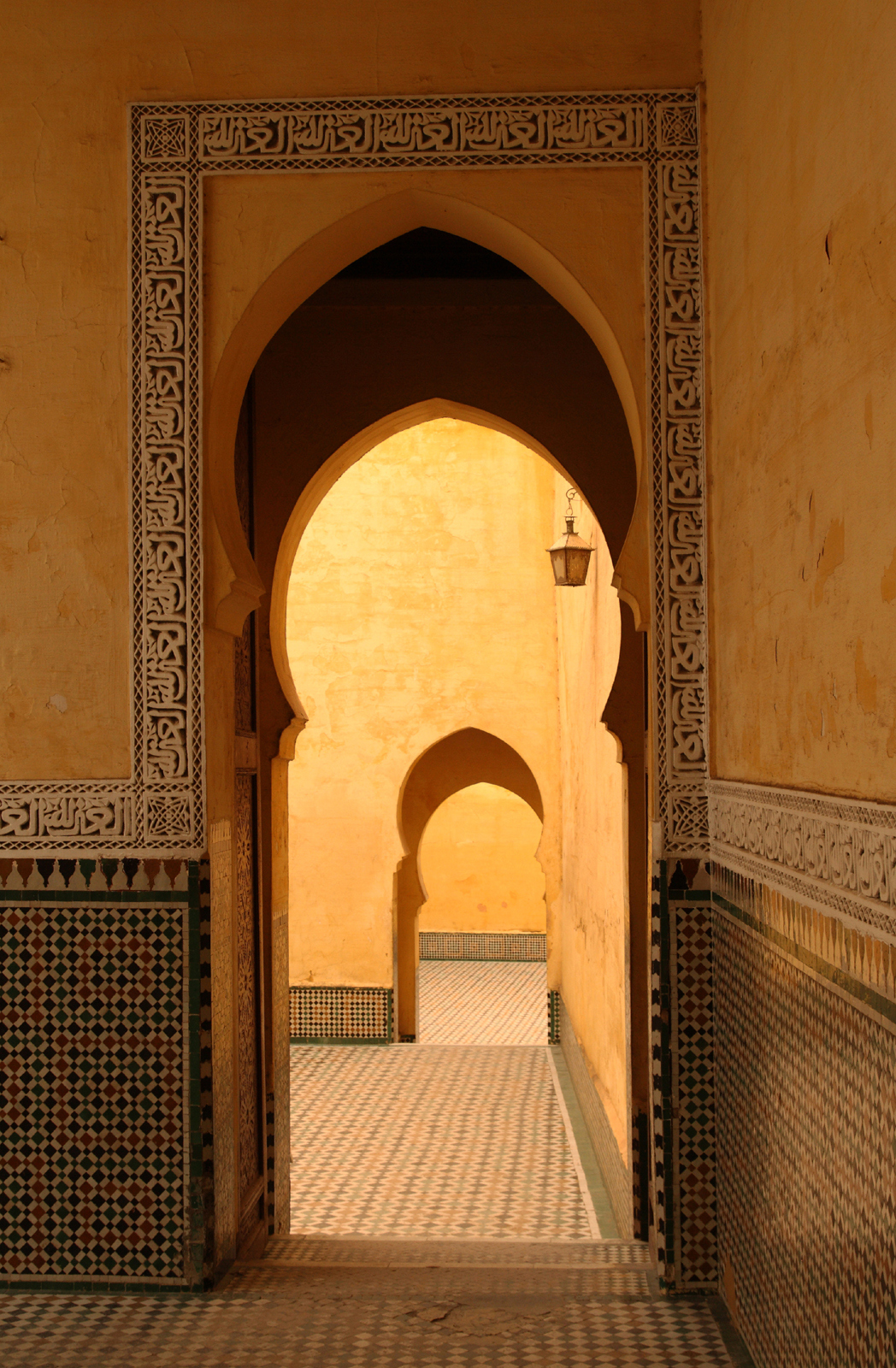
One of the archways and passages leading towards the main courtyard of the funerary complex

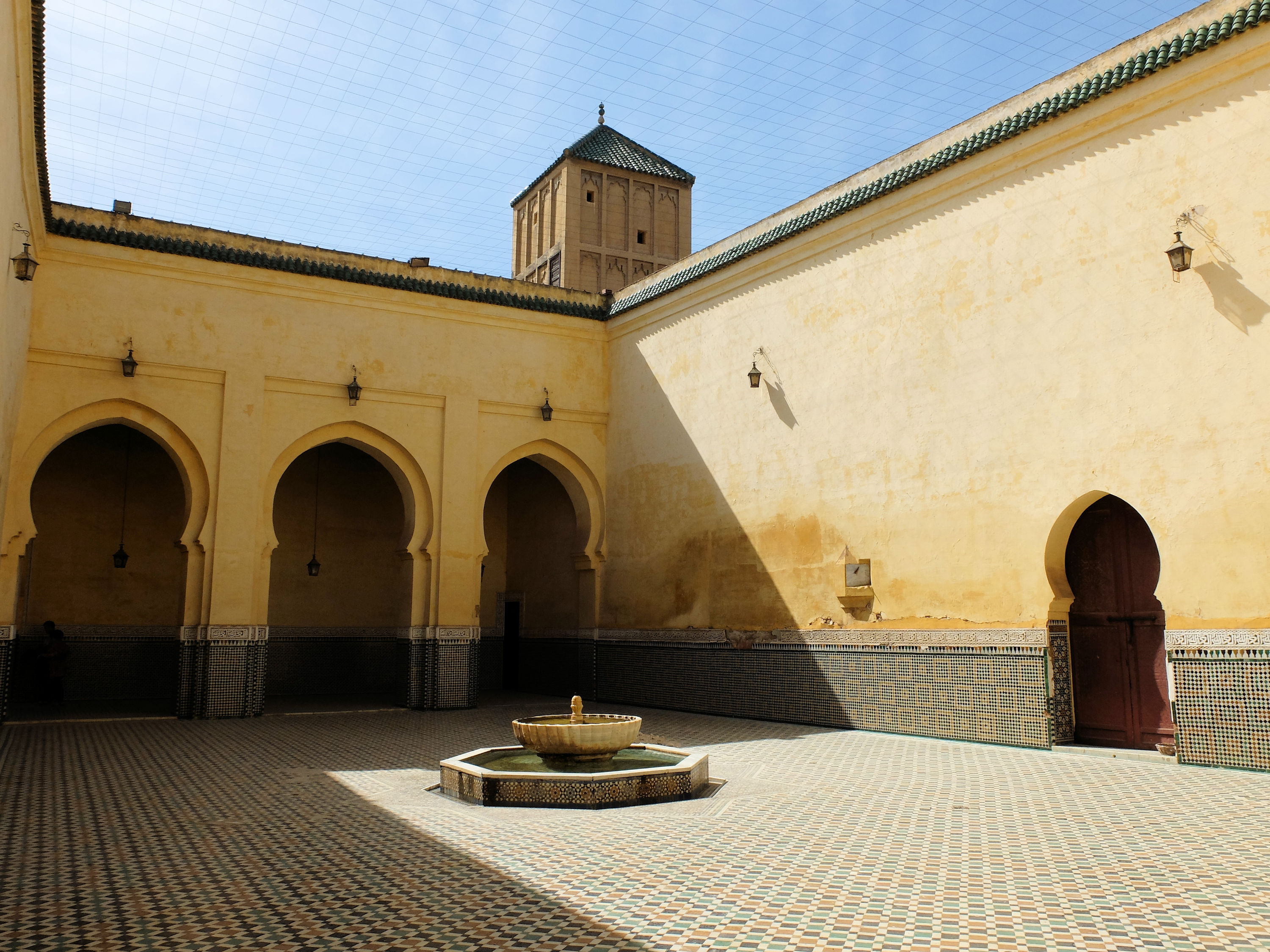
Main courtyard next to the mausoleum (looking west)

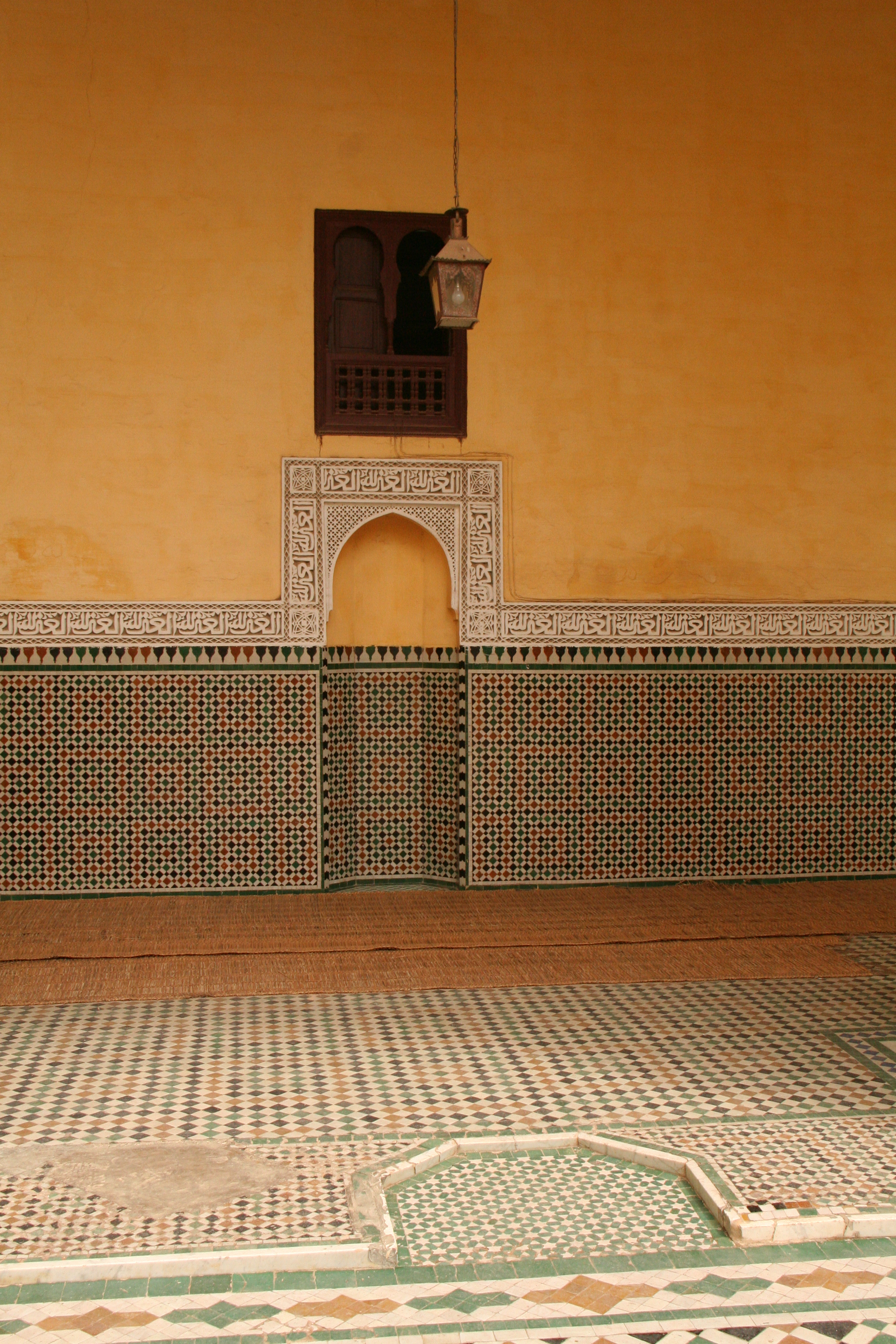
The mihrab of the main courtyard

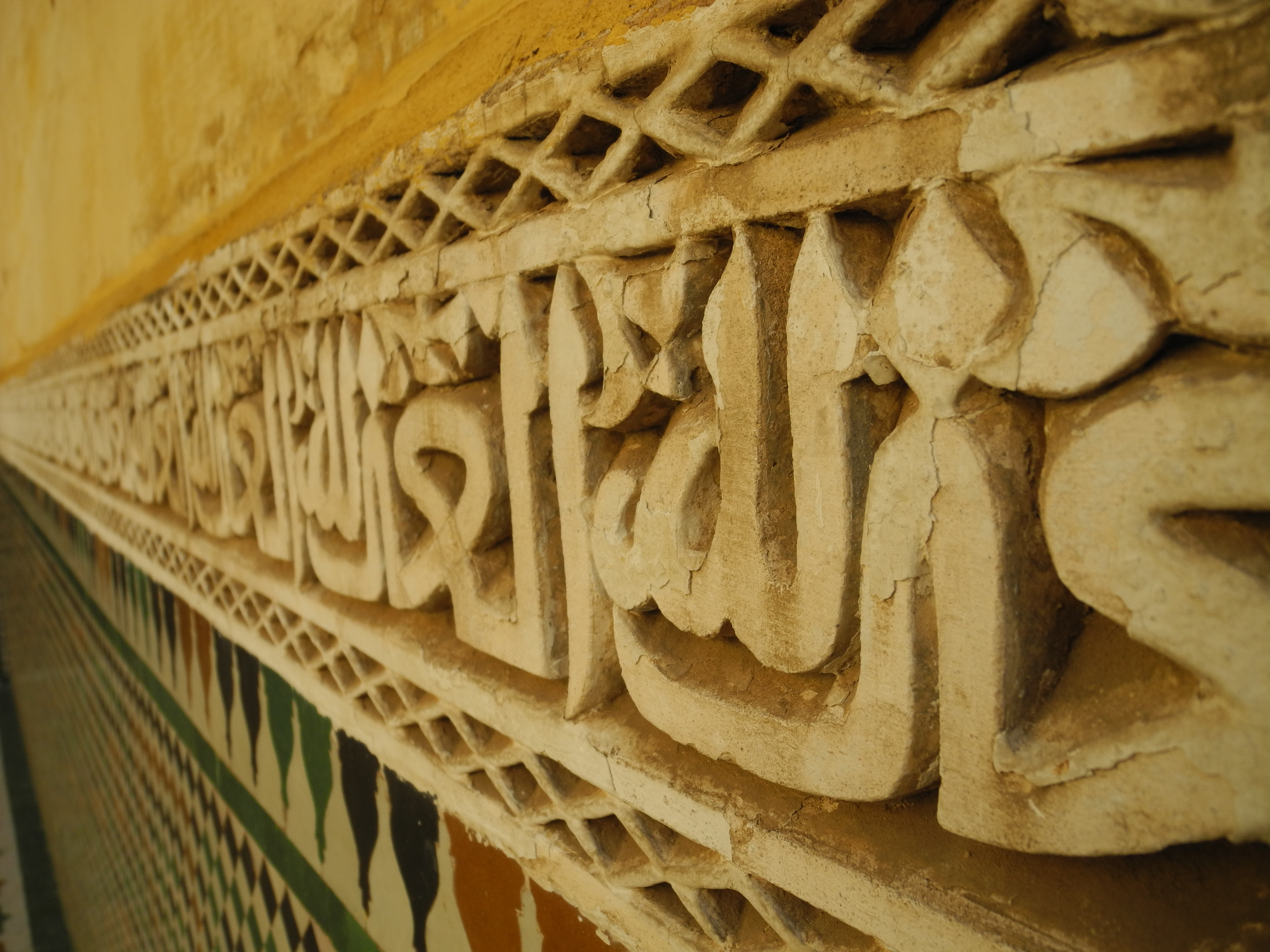
Stucco-carved calligraphy along the walls of the courtyard

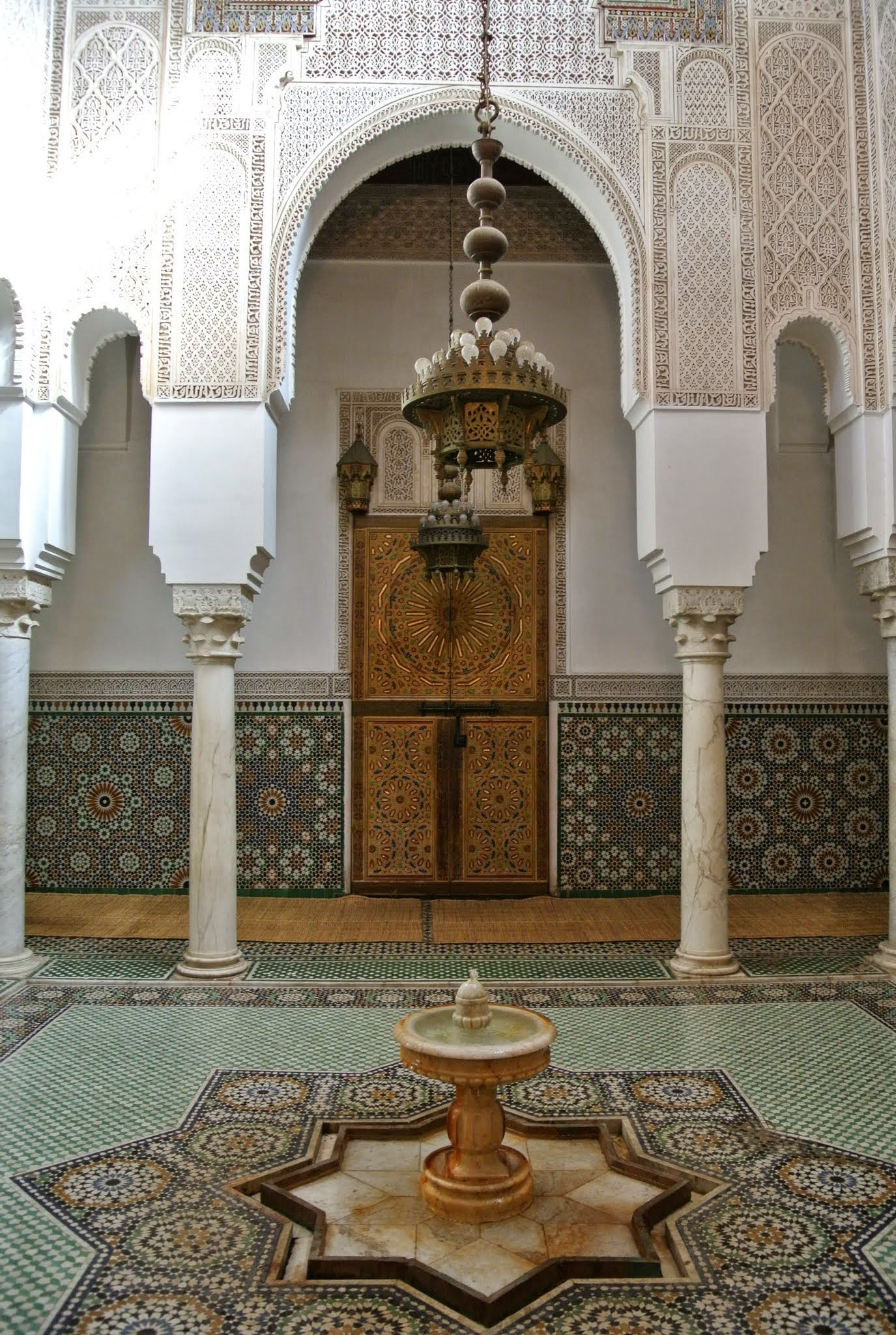
The indoor patio chamber to the north of the mausoleum, with a central fountain and marble columns

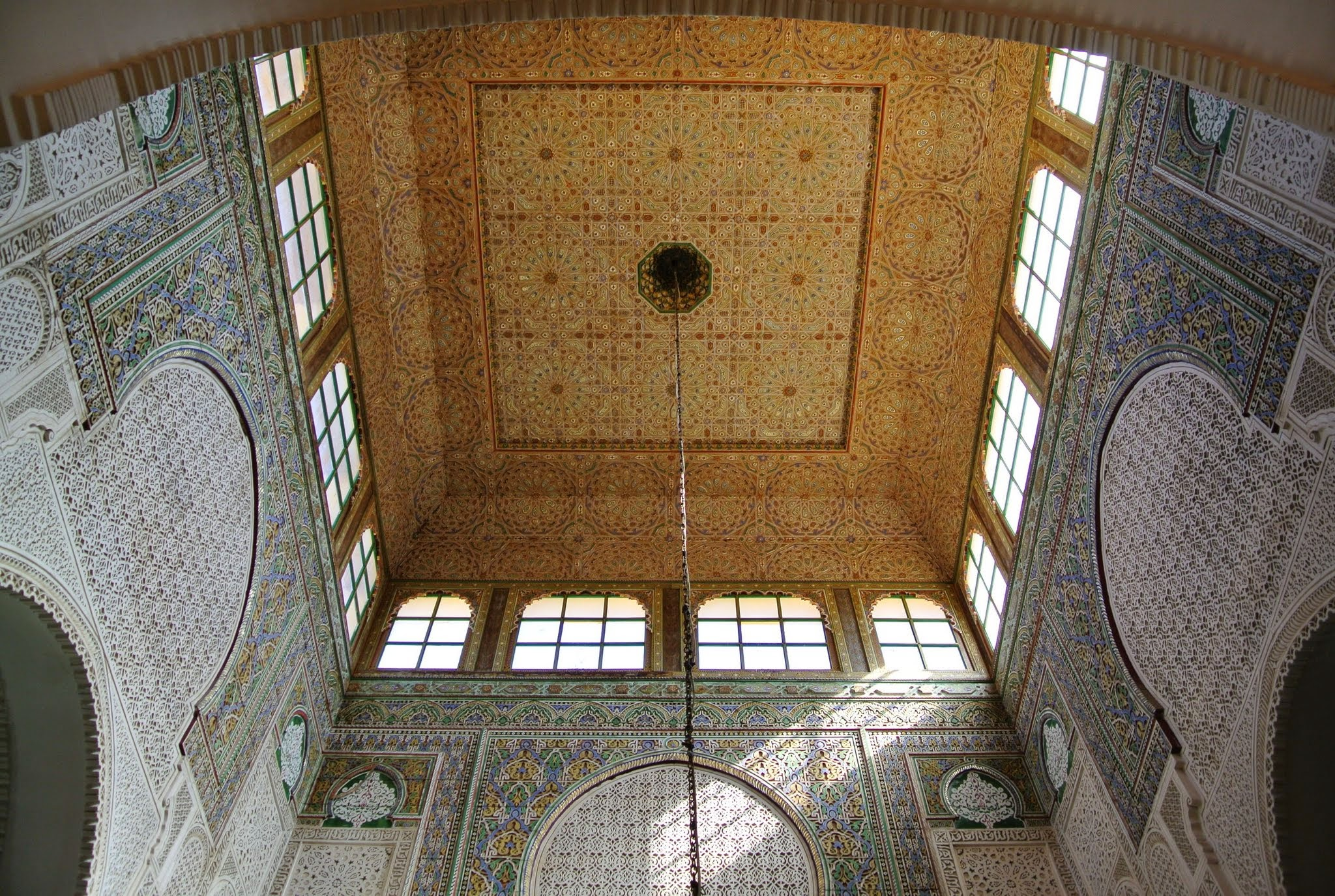
The wooden cupola ceiling and stucco-carved walls of the patio

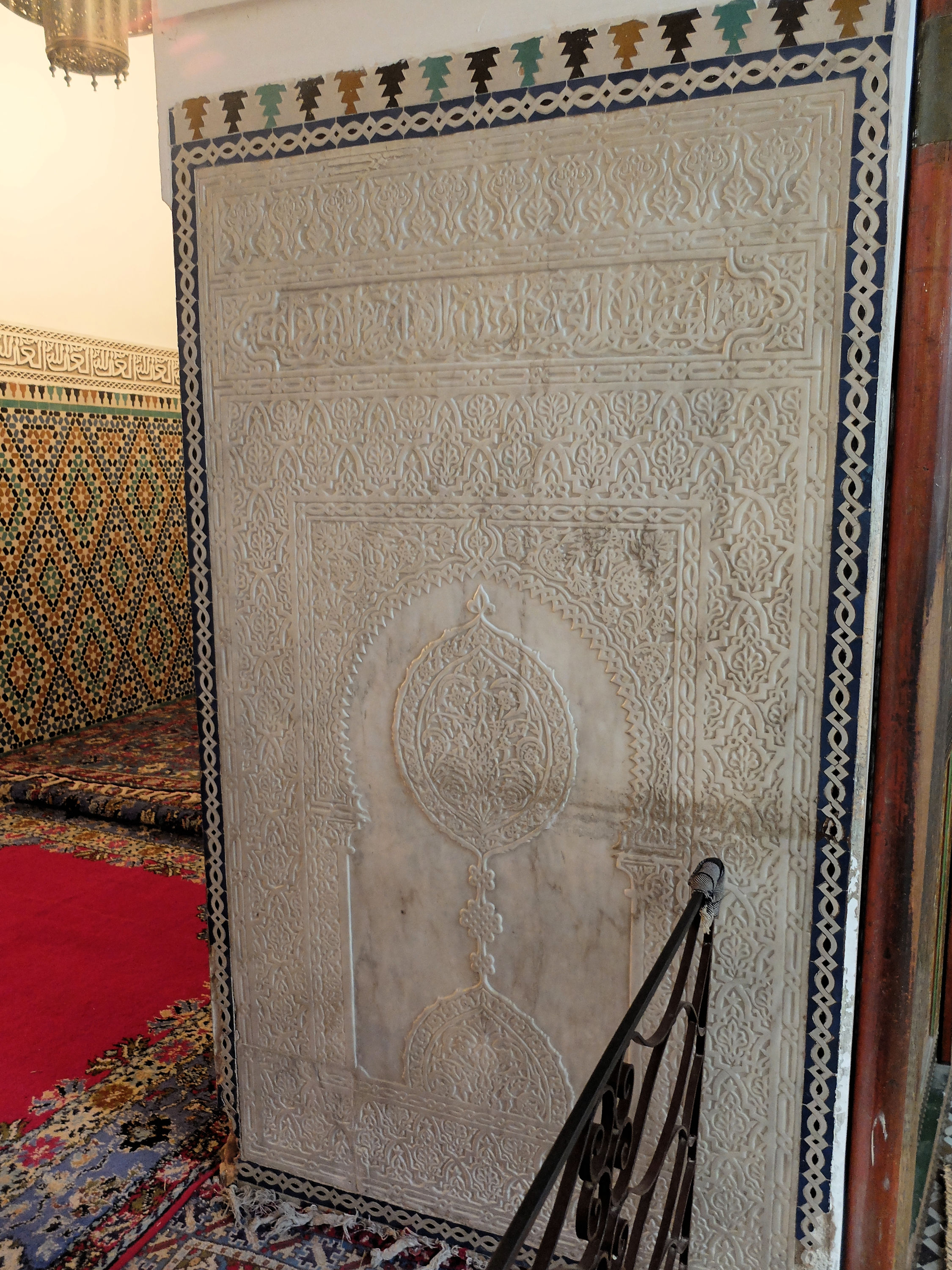
Saadian-era carved marble panel at the entrance to the tomb chamber

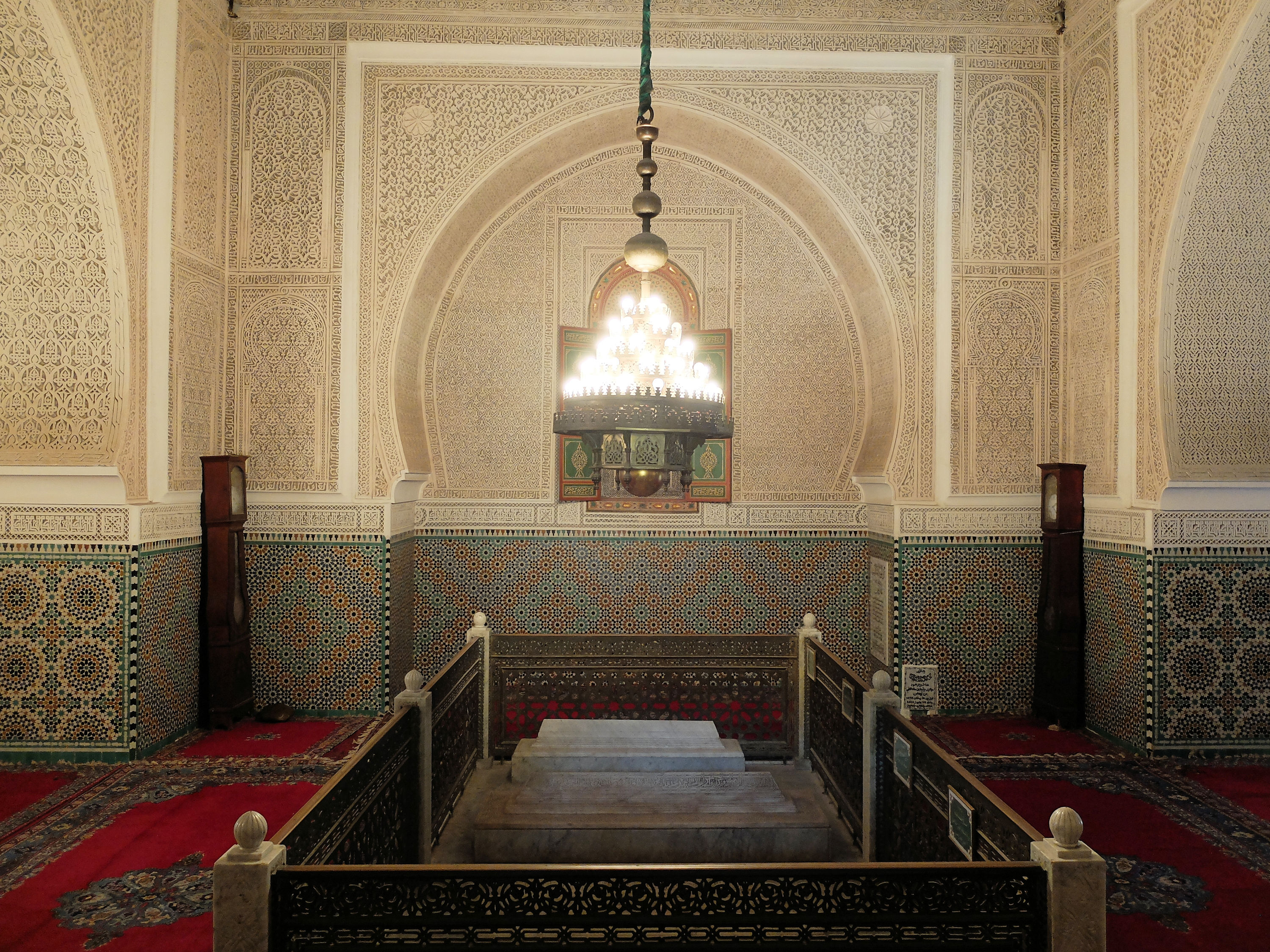
The tomb of Moulay Ismail (alongside another member of his dynasty)
