= Shaqroun Al-Wajdiji al-Tilimsani =

Maliki jurist from Tlemcen

- محمد شقرون بن هبة الله الوجديجي التلمساني
- Born: 1503; Tlemcen
- Died: 1574 (aged 70–71); Fez
- Occupations: Scholar, Maliki juris, Teacher

Academic work
- Notable works: Explanation of al-Arjūzah al-Tilimsāniyah fi al-Fara'id by Abu Ishaq al-Ansari al-Tilimsani.

Shaqroun Al-Wajdiji Al-Tilimsani (Arabic: شقرون الوجديجي التلمساني) was a prominent Maliki jurist originally from Tlemcen. Born around c. 1503 and died c. 1574 in Fez, he was nicknamed Malik al-Saghir (young Malik) during his time due to his exceptional expertise in Maliki jurisprudence. In 1559, he left Tlemcen for Fez due to the prevailing political instability.

In Fez, he was appointed as a mufti by the Saadian Sultan Abdallah El-Ghalib. He also taught within the royal palace, where numerous students benefited from his knowledge until his death.

== Biography ==
His full name is Mohamed Shaqroun Ben Hibatallah Al-Wajdiji, originating from Tlemcen, which earned him the surname al-Tilimsani. He was born in 908 AH (1502–1503). He was mufti of his hometown before emigrating to Fez around 1559, following the example of many Tlemcen scholar. This migration was prompted by the internal conflicts that plagued the final years of the Zayyanid Kingdom, caught between the pressure of the Banū Wattas to the west and the Ottomans to the east, creating an atmosphere of instability and restricted freedoms.

In Fez, Shaqroun was warmly received by Sultan Abdallah El-Ghalib, who brought him into his court and appointed him as the mufti of Marrakech and the commander of sciences in the region. Shaqroun shared his knowledge in majalis (knowledge assemblies), which attracted many scholars, including the Sultan himself.

Renowned for his extraordinary command of Maliki jurisprudence, he earned the nickname Malik Al-Saghir ("the little Malik"). He was also skilled in the art of eloquence (al-Bayan, a branch of Arabic rhetoric) and logic. Beyond the court, he taught the Mukhtasar of Ibn al-Hajib, a popular text in Maliki jurisprudence.

The Fassi scholar Ahmed al-Mandjur described him as: "The accomplished scholar, the collaborator, the mufti, the preacher... I benefited from his teachings in matters of belief, jurisprudence, hadith, literature, and many other fields." Ibrahim al-Chawi was also among his notable disciples.

Shaqroun Al-Tilimsani died in 982 AH (1574) at the age of 74 in Fez.

== Work ==
- Explanation of al-Arjūzah al-Tilimsāniyah fi al-Fara'id by Abu Ishaq al-Ansari al-Tilimsani.

== See also ==
- List of Islamic jurists
- List of Muslim comparative theologians
