= Abd al-Rahman al-Tamanarti =

Abu Zayd Abd al-Rahman al-Jazuli al-Tamanarti al-Mghafri (Arabic: أبو زيد عبد الرحمن التمنارتي; died 1070 AH, 1659/60 AD) was a qadi of the Moroccan town of Taroudannt and grand qadi of the Sous area. He was the author of Fawaid al Jamma bi Isnadi Ouloumi al Oumma, an autobiographical work of great historical value that also includes biographies of his instructors. Appended to this work is a chapter about dreams, "Bab al-rabi".

== See also ==
- Ibn Jalal Tilimsani
