= El Badi Palace =

Historical monument in Marrakesh, Morocco

- قصر البديع
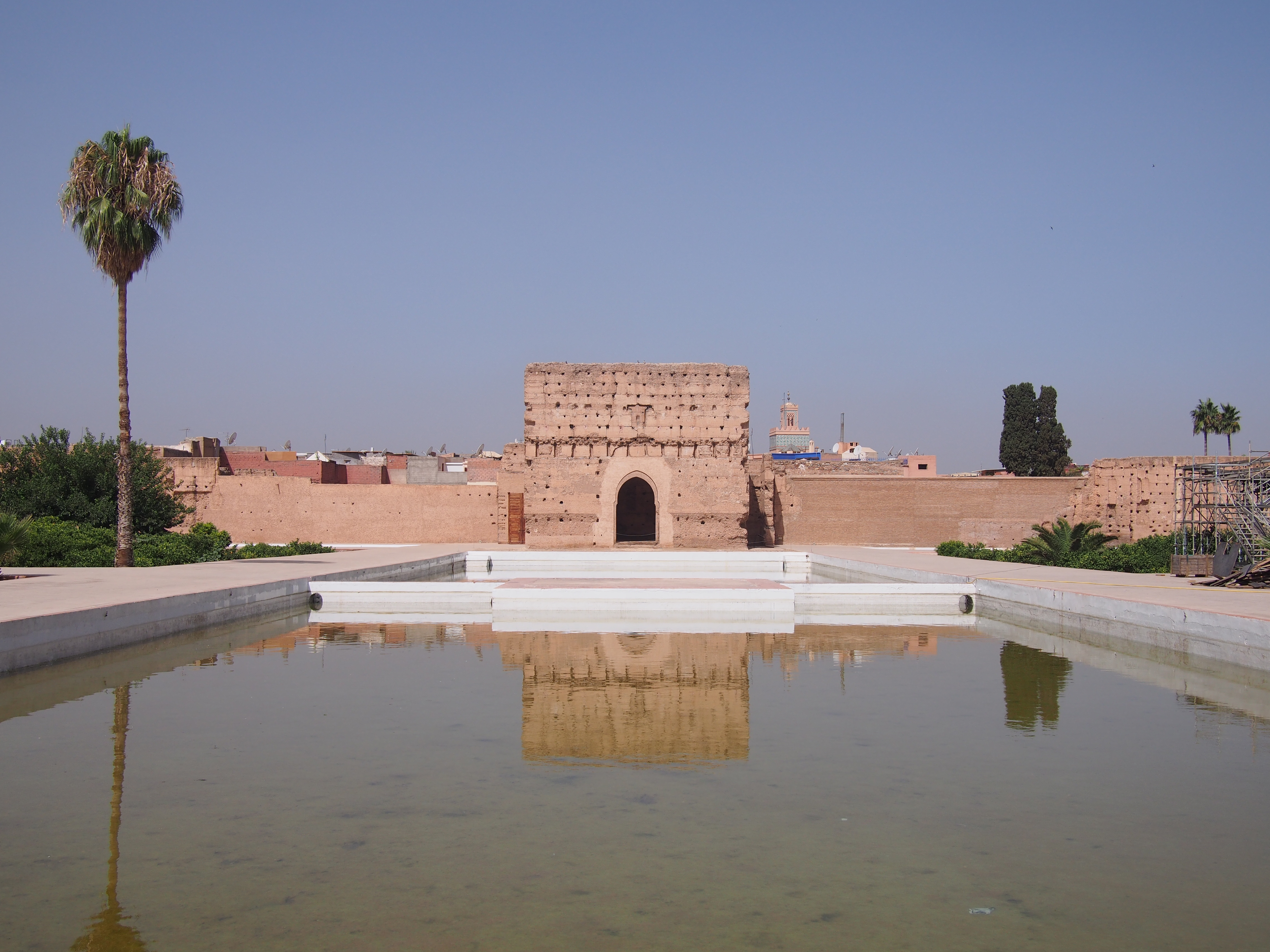
- The central pool and courtyard of the palace, looking towards the remains of the western pavilion
- Alternative names: The Incomparable Palace

General information
- Type: Palace
- Architectural style: Saadian, Moroccan, Moorish
- Location: Ksibat Nhass, Marrakesh, Morocco
- Coordinates: 31.6183°N 7.9858°W
- Construction started: 1578
- Completed: 1593
- Demolished: ca. late 17th century

El Badi Palace or Badi' Palace (Arabic: قصر البديع, lit. 'Palace of Wonder/Brilliance', also frequently translated as the "Incomparable Palace") is a ruined palace in Marrakesh, Morocco. It was commissioned by the sultan Ahmad al-Mansur of the Saadian dynasty a few months after his accession in 1578, with construction and embellishment continuing throughout most of his reign. The palace, decorated with materials imported from numerous countries ranging from Italy to Mali, was used for receptions and designed to showcase the Sultan's wealth and power. It was one part of a larger Saadian palace complex occupying the Kasbah district of Marrakesh.

The palace was neglected after al-Mansur's death in 1603 and eventually fell into ruin with the decline of the Saadian dynasty. Its valuable materials, particularly marble, were stripped away and reused in other buildings throughout Morocco. Today, it is a significant tourist attraction in Marrakesh and serves as an exhibition space. Notably, the Minbar of the Kutubiyya Mosque is displayed here.

== Name ==
The name el-Badi' (Arabic: البديع), typically translated as "the Incomparable", is one of the 99 Names of God in Islam. Ahmad al-Mansur may have chosen the name due to his own reputed piety, but also to reflect his intention to create a superlative palace to impress guests. The name also had historical precedents in Moorish palace architecture as it was used to designate one of the pavilions in the Caliph's palace in Cordoba, Spain (al-Andalus).

== History ==
=== Background ===
Prior to the reign of the Saadian sultan Moulay Abdallah al-Ghalib (ruled 1557–1574), the rulers of Marrakesh resided in the old Kasbah (citadel) built by the Almohad dynasty in the late 12th and early 13th century. According to the contemporary chronicler Marmol, Moulay Abdallah, a major builder in his time, was the first to build a new palace in the area where the El Badi Palace stands, along the northern edge of the Almohad kasbah near the Kasbah Mosque and the newly-begun Saadian Tombs. The El Badi Palace proper, however, was constructed by Sultan Ahmad al-Mansur al-Dhahabi (ruled 1578–1603) at the height of the Saadian dynasty's power. The palace's construction, along with al-Mansur's other projects, was probably funded by the substantial ransom paid by the Portuguese after the Battle of the Three Kings in 1578. The wealth of al-Mansur's reign was also due to the Saadians' control of the sugar trade. Morocco was at that time a significant exporter of sugar towards Europe, along with other products such as silk, copper, and leather. In 1590 al-Mansur launched military expeditions to the south which resulted in the conquest of Timbuktu and Gao in Mali and the defeat of the Songhai Empire. This control of the trans-Saharan trade routes allowed al-Mansur to increase Morocco's access not only to gold but also to slaves – on which the sugar processing industry relied and which were necessary to compete with the sugar trade coming from Brazil and the Caribbean (controlled by Europeans and also reliant on slaves).

=== Construction ===
According to al-Ifrani, construction of the palace began in December 1578 (Shawwal 986 AH), only a few months after the Saadian victory at the Battle of the Three Kings and Ahmad's accession to power, and took fifteen years, finishing in 1593 (1002 AH). French historian Gaston Deverdun, however, points out that the "Portuguese plan" of 1585 (an illustrated document providing important information on the layout of Marrakesh's kasbah at the time) shows us a fully completed palace, while at the same time there also exist records of Ahmad al-Mansur purchasing marble for construction up until 1602, a year before his death. This suggests that the major constructions of the palace may have been completed by the early 1580s but that al-Mansur continued to embellish the palace up until his death.

The construction of the palace was a major enterprise. The sultan had workers and artisans brought from many regions, including Europe, to aid in the construction; so much so that a flourishing market established itself near the construction site to cater to the workers. Al-Mansur was so involved in making sure that work continued efficiently that he even provided child care for his workers in order to ensure they were not distracted by other priorities. Materials were also imported from multiple regions and foreign countries, including marble columns fabricated in Italy and lime and plaster from Timbuktu.

=== Decline ===
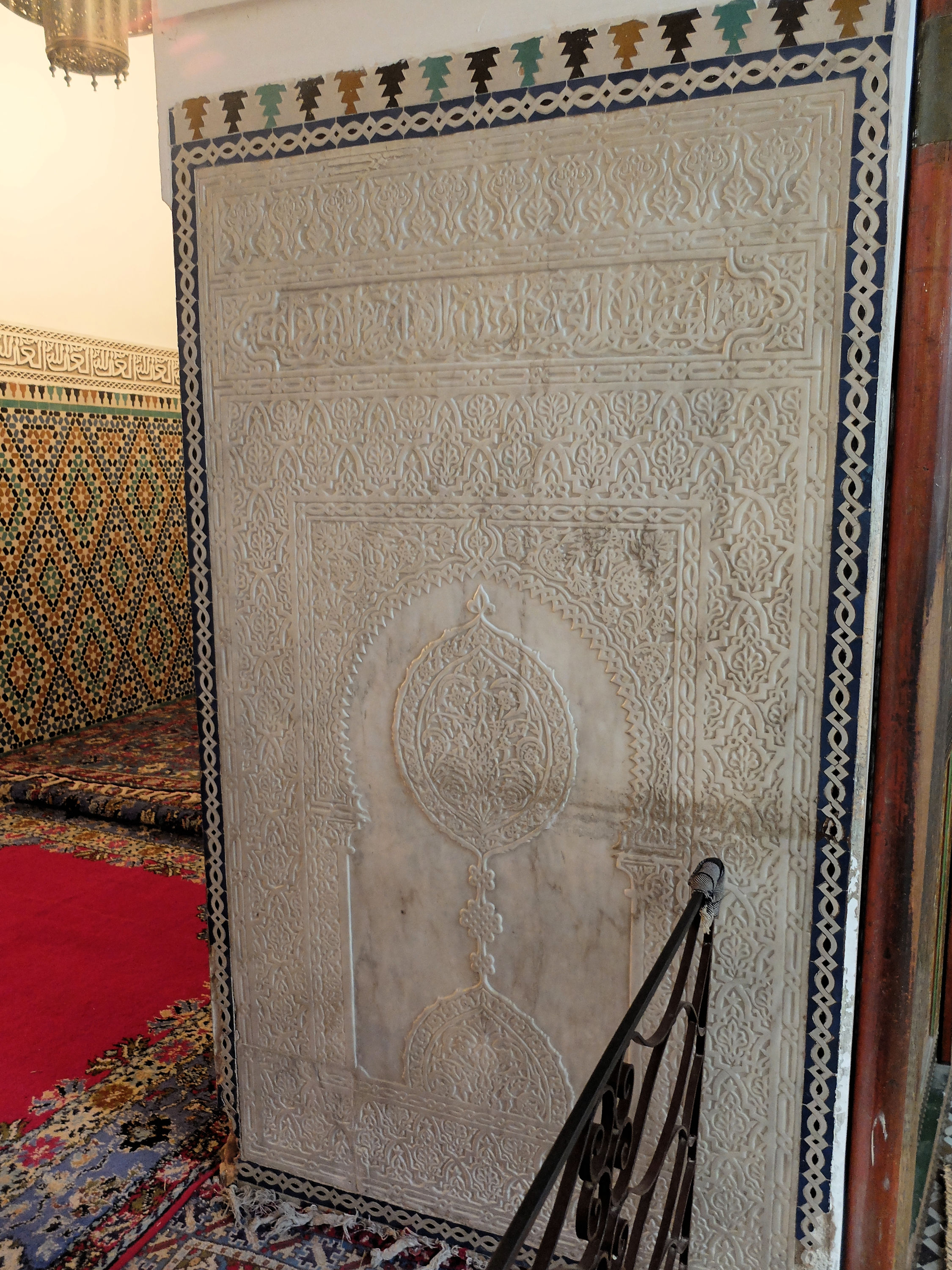
Example of a Saadian-period marble panel looted from Marrakesh by Moulay Ismail, reused in his mausoleum

After the fall of the Saadians and the rise of the Alawi dynasty the palace entered a period of rapid decline. It does not appear to have been maintained after al-Mansur's death and its premises were even plagued by malaria at one point. While the first Alaouite sultan, Moulay Rashid, was able to live here briefly in 1668–1669, less than ten years later his successor Moulay Isma'il ibn Sharif was unwilling to let ambassadors visit it because of its bad state.

According to al-Ifrani, in 1707-08 (1119 AH) Moulay Isma'il ordered that the palace be demolished and stripped of its contents, materials and decorations, which were then re-used in the construction of his new palace and capital in Meknes. In reality, the dismantlement of the palace likely occurred progressively over time, beginning well before 1707 and also continuing after Moulay Isma'il. Architectural elements of Saadian origin, most likely including elements from the Badi Palace, are found in a number of buildings across Morocco and even in Algiers; for example, the Mausoleum of Moulay Isma'il in Meknes and the Zawiya of Moulay Idris II in Fes. In the meantime, the ruins of the palace became a grazing site for animals and even an owl sanctuary.

=== Present day ===
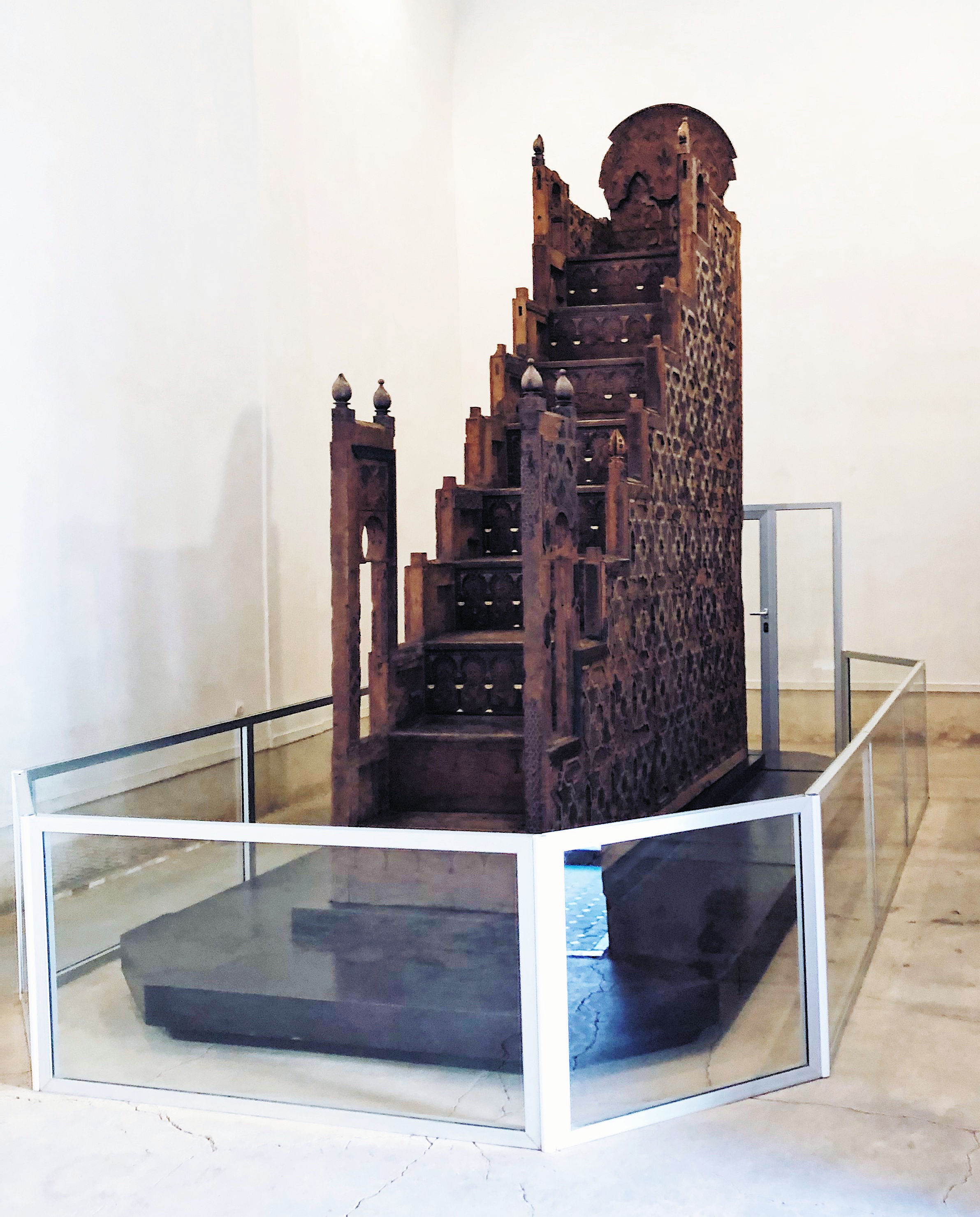
Minbar of the Kutubiyya Mosque, one of the objects on display in the palace today

The palace today is a well-known tourist attraction. The complex contains an exhibition space where the 12th-century Almoravid minbar that once stood in the Kutubiyya Mosque is on display, in addition to other exhibition spaces opened in 2018. For a number of years the Marrakesh Folklore Festival has taken place within the palace.

The palace was significantly damaged in the September 2023 earthquake that struck southern Morocco. An early assessment of the damage found major cracks in the walls of the palace's exhibition rooms and in the area where the modern bathrooms are located. The site was temporarily closed for repairs and was reopened to visitors in October 2023.

== The Saadian royal complex ==
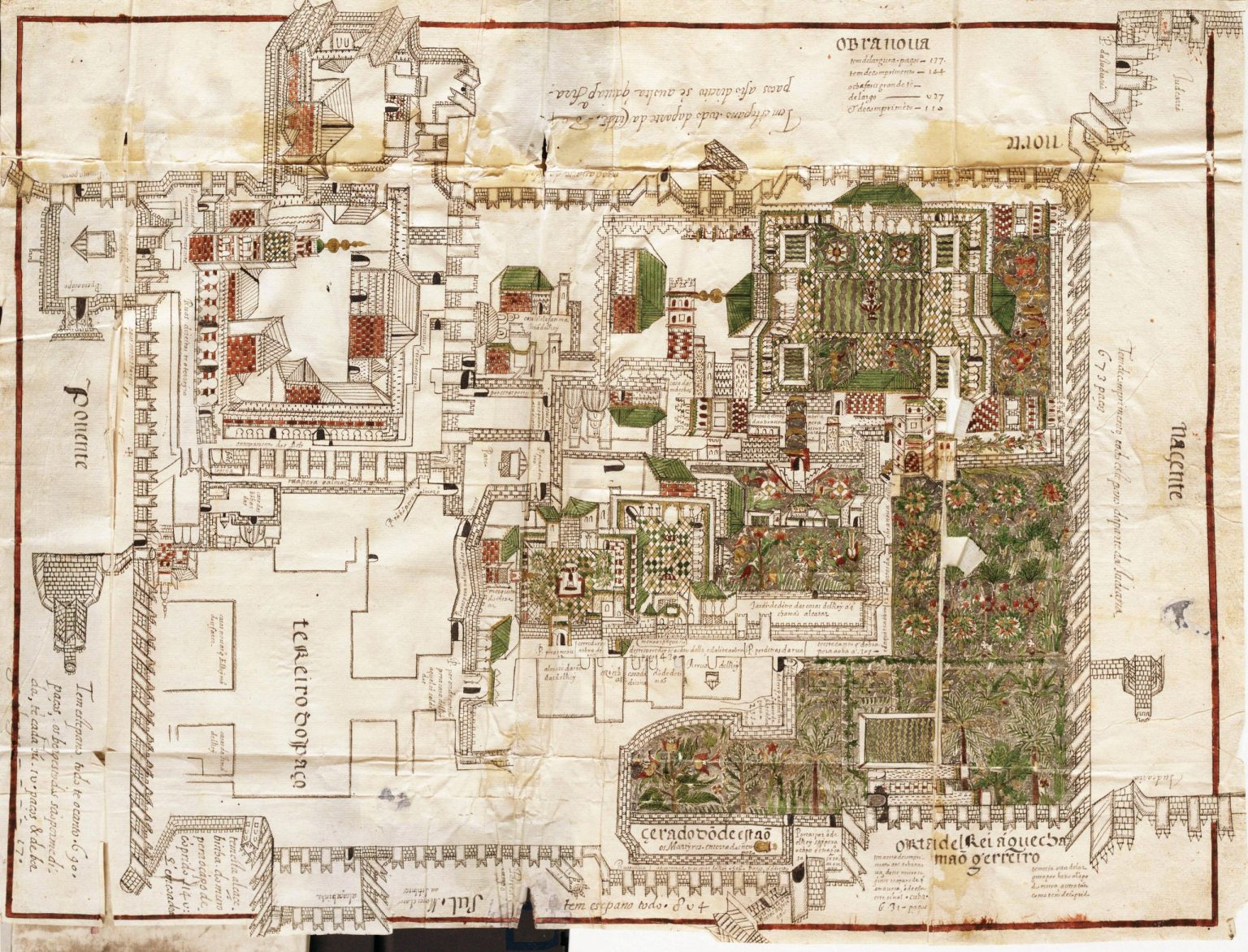
The "Portuguese Plan" of 1585 depicts the Kasbah of Marrakesh during Ahmad al-Mansur's rule. The Badi Palace, enclosing four pools and gardens, is visible in the upper right.

The Saadian palaces formed a complex built inside the vast kasbah (citadel) on the south side of the city, originally laid out during the Almohad period under Caliph Ya'qub al-Mansur. Some of the various elements of the Saadian palaces may have already been built under Abdallah al-Ghalib, while Ahmad al-Mansur added to them and embellished them.

The complex was entered via a "Grand Mechouar", a vast ceremonial square or courtyard, to the south of the Almohad-era Kasbah Mosque. The main gate of the royal palace was situated here and led to a smaller mechouar from which a long passage ran east to give access to the palace's various components. On the south side of this passage were most of the functional annexes of the palace, including kitchens, warehouses, the treasury, and stables. On the north side of the passage was the vast reception palace, the El Badi proper, along with the private quarters of the sultan and his family, their bathhouses (hammams), a private mosque, and the mint. Finally, beyond these structures, occupying the whole eastern side of the kasbah, were a number of pleasure gardens. These included the Crystal Garden (az-zujaj), the royal garden known as al-Mustaha ("the Desired") with a grand water basin, and the Qasr Garden or inner garden for al-Mansur's private quarters. Ahmad al-Mansur also renovated the vast Agdal Gardens to the south of the kasbah, originally created by the Almohads. The entire palace and citadel complex was surrounded by fortified walls, as in Almohad times and as still seen today.

One curious feature inside the palace complex was a tall tower which is prominently depicted in descriptions of Marrakesh during the Saadian period but which was missing in the later Alawi era. Of uncertain origin, this structure may have been a private observation tower dating from either the Almohad or Saadian dynasty, used for the enjoyment of the sultan and similar to smaller elevated lookouts present in some aristocratic mansions in Marrakesh and Fes.

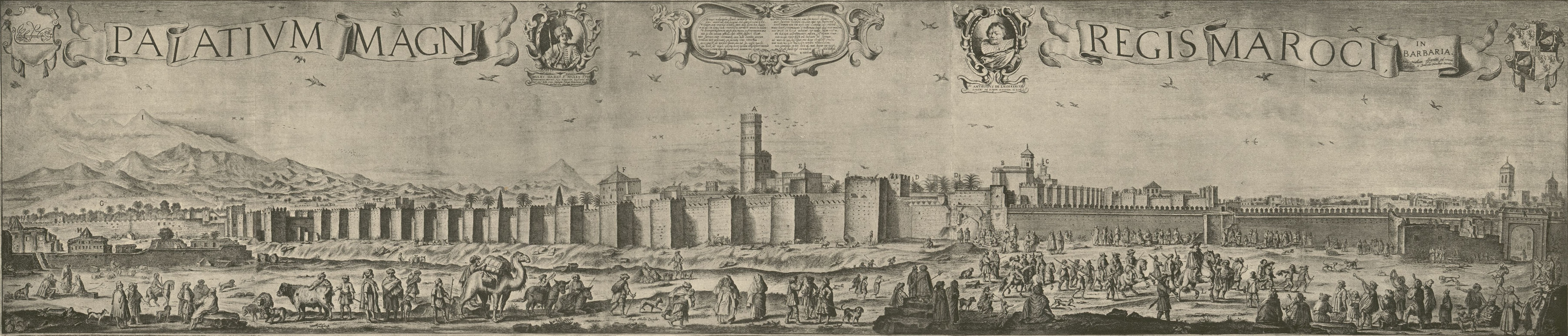
An illustration of Marrakesh and its Kasbah (citadel and palaces), seen from the east, by Adriaen Matham, 1640. Among other features, the image shows a tall tower that once stood in the Saadian palaces, which later disappeared and whose origin has been debated among scholars.

== Architecture of El Badi ==
=== Layout ===
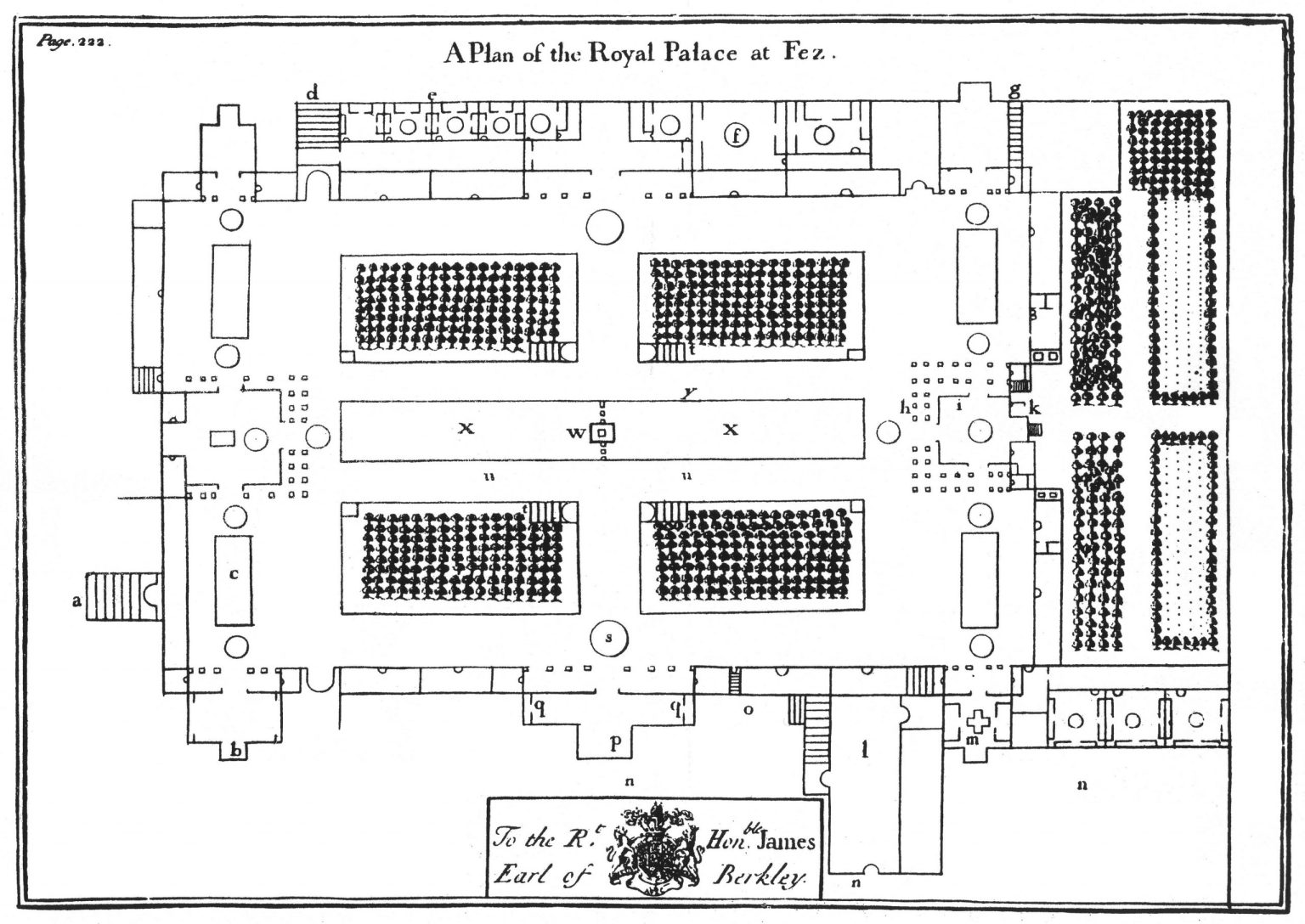
Plan of the Badi Palace originally drawn by Jacob Golius circa 1622 (before its destruction), showing the various rooms, gardens, pools, and fountains

The El Badi Palace itself was a reception palace where Sultan Ahmad al-Mansur hosted and received guests. The floor plan of the palace is essentially rectangular, centered around a huge courtyard (measuring 135 by 110 metres) with a central pool (measuring 90.4 by 21.7 metres). The courtyard also had four enormous sunken gardens, excavated and rediscovered in modern times, which were arranged symmetrically around the central pool, as well as four other water basins (measuring roughly 30 by 20 metres) along the west and east sides of the courtyard. This arrangement was essentially that of a riad garden (a symmetrical interior garden in Moorish architecture) on a grand scale.

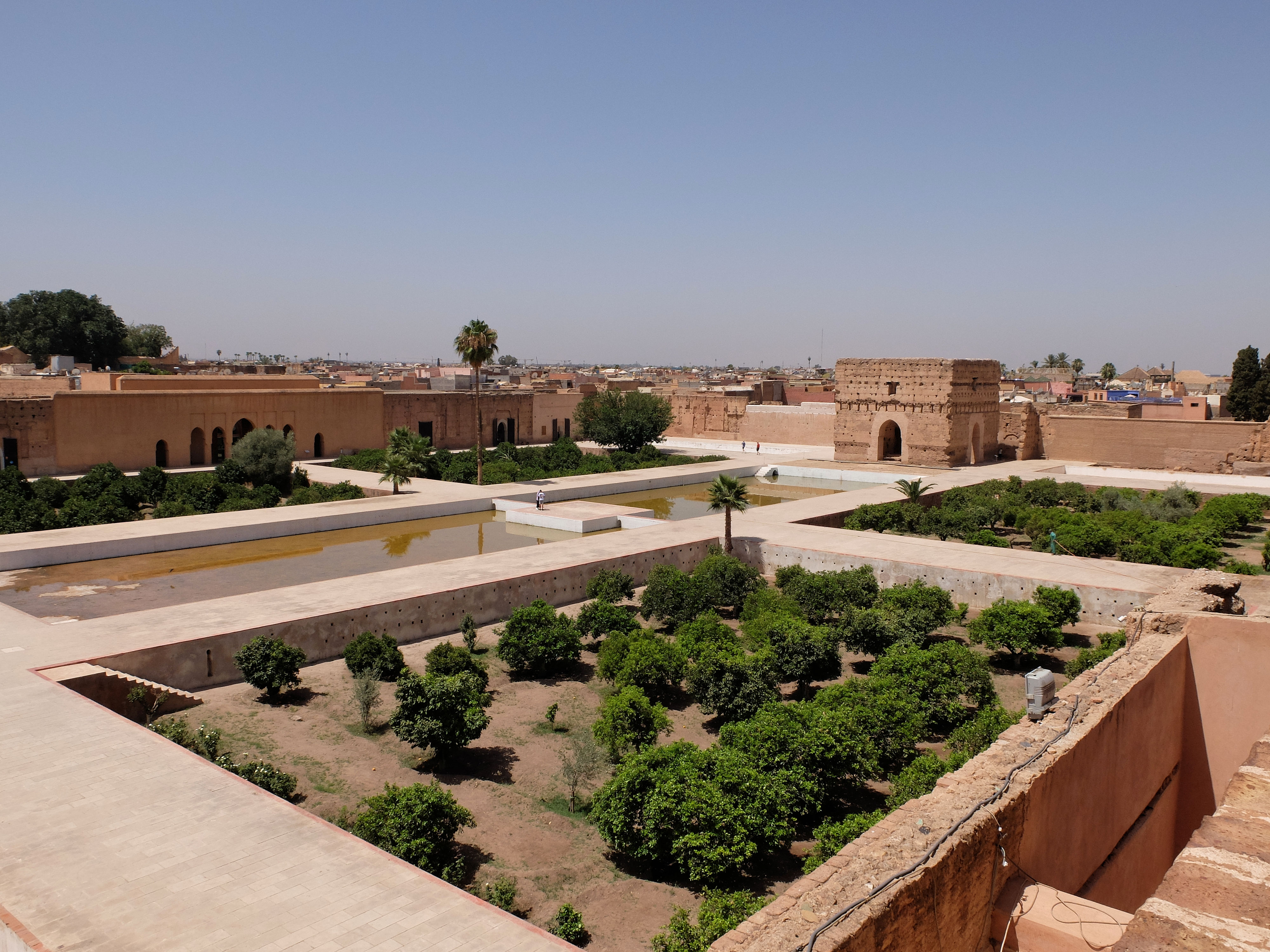
Overall view of the Badi Palace's main courtyard, featuring a central water basin and four large sunken gardens

Each side of this rectangular courtyard had a large pavilion with a grand and ornate cupola (qubba), around which were other cupolas and structures. The two largest pavilions faced each other at the eastern and western ends of the courtyard. This arrangement of pavilions appears to be an evolution of the layout seen in the Court of the Lions in the Alhambra, but on a grander scale.

The western pavilion of the courtyard was known in Arabic as al-Qubbat al-Khamsiniya (Arabic: القُبة الَخْمسينية, lit. 'Dome/Pavilion of the Fifty') named either after its surface area of some 50 cubits or the fact that it once featured 50 columns. "Al-Quba al-Khamsiniya" is also the title of a poem by Abd al-Aziz al-Fishtali, poet laureate of Sultan Ahmad al-Mansur's court. It served as a reception hall or throne hall for the sultan. An alcove in the back wall of the chamber marks the spot where the sultan used to sit in attendance. Above this alcove was an Arabic inscription carved in black marble amidst the white marble covering the rest of the walls. At the middle of the hall was a fountain flanked by two water basins covered in delicate zellij decoration and fed with water spurting from silver sculptures of animals such as leopards, lions and pythons.

The pavilion on the eastern side of the courtyard (no longer standing today) was known as the Qubbat az-Zujaj (Arabic: قبة الزجاج, lit. 'Pavilion of Crystal/Glass') or Qubbat ad-Dahab (Arabic: قبة الذهب, lit. 'Pavilion of Gold'). It was reserved for the sultan's private use and gave access to the Crystal Garden to the east (mentioned above).

The pavilion on the courtyard's north side was known as the Qubbat al-Khadra (Arabic: القبة الخضراء, lit. 'Green Pavilion') and once had two stories with a number of rooms. An annex on the west side of this pavilion, paved with zellij and accessible to visitors today, contained three residential quarters which may have been used as guest quarters for foreign ambassadors.

The southern pavilion was known as the Qubbat al-Khayzuran (Arabic: قبة الخيزران, lit. 'Pavilion of the Heliotrope/Myrtle'; possibly also named after one of al-Mansur's favourite concubines) and may have led to the women's quarters. Behind this pavilion were bathhouses which have been partially excavated and whose remains can be visited today. Aside from the pavilions, the rest of the courtyard's perimeter was lined with a gallery featuring "lambrequin" or "muqarnas"-profiled arches similar to those seen in the Court of the Lions and in other Moroccan Architecture.

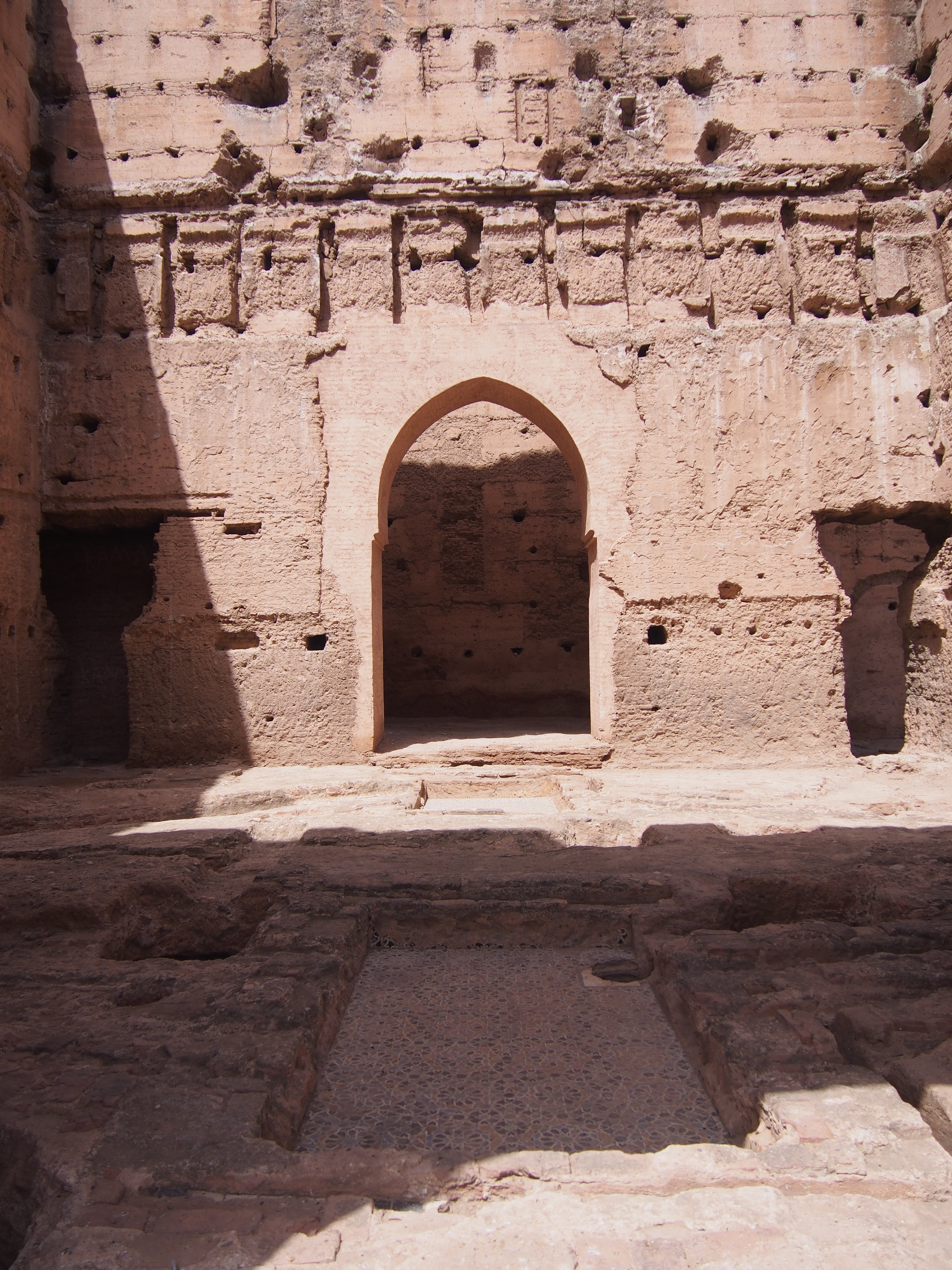
The former reception hall and throne room inside the western pavilion, the Qubba al-Khamsiniya. In the foreground are the remains of a rectangular water basin covered in zellij mosaic tilework.

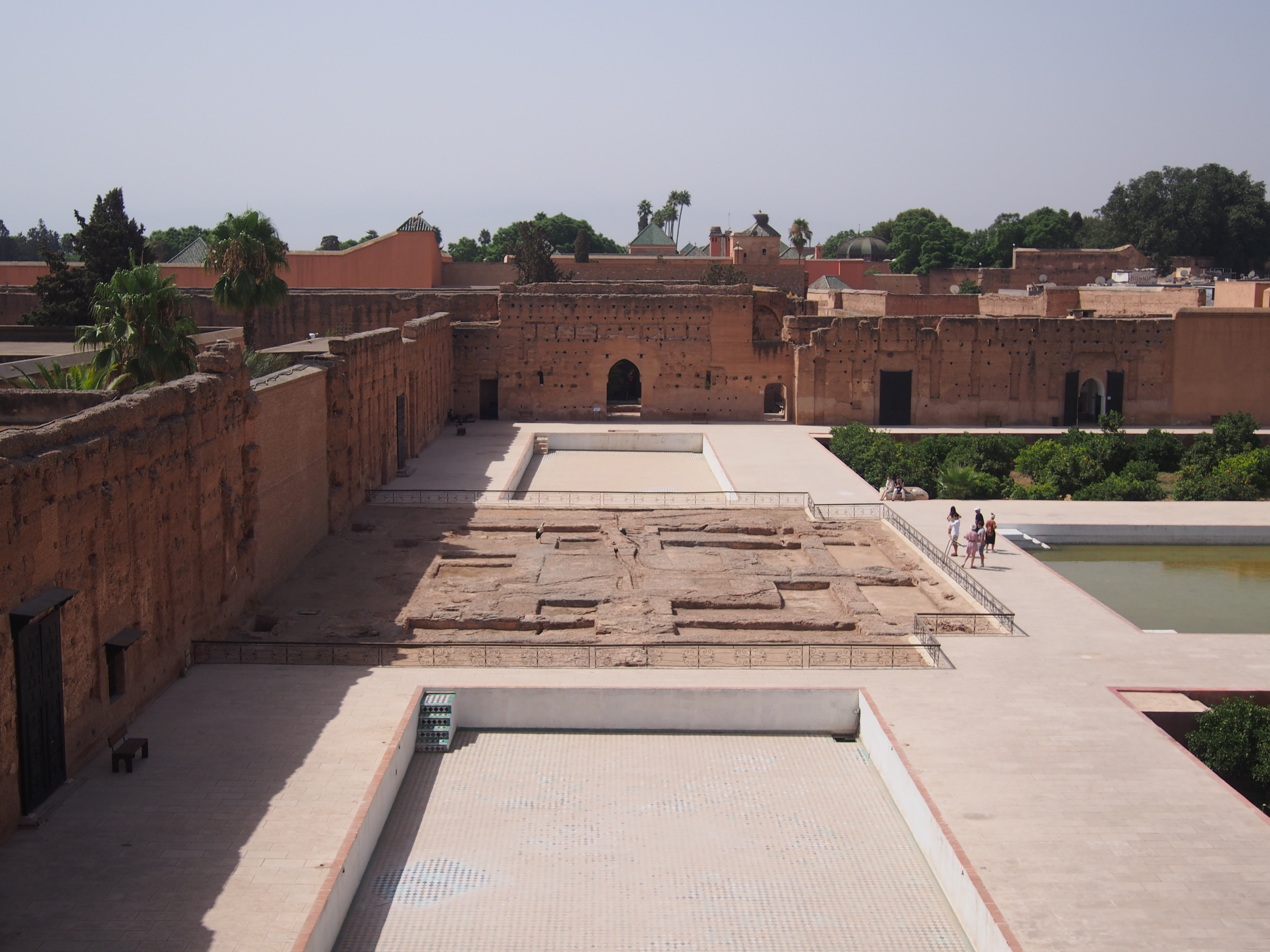
The eastern pavilion (the Qubbat al-Zujaj), no longer standing today but showing remains of the underground water infrastructure

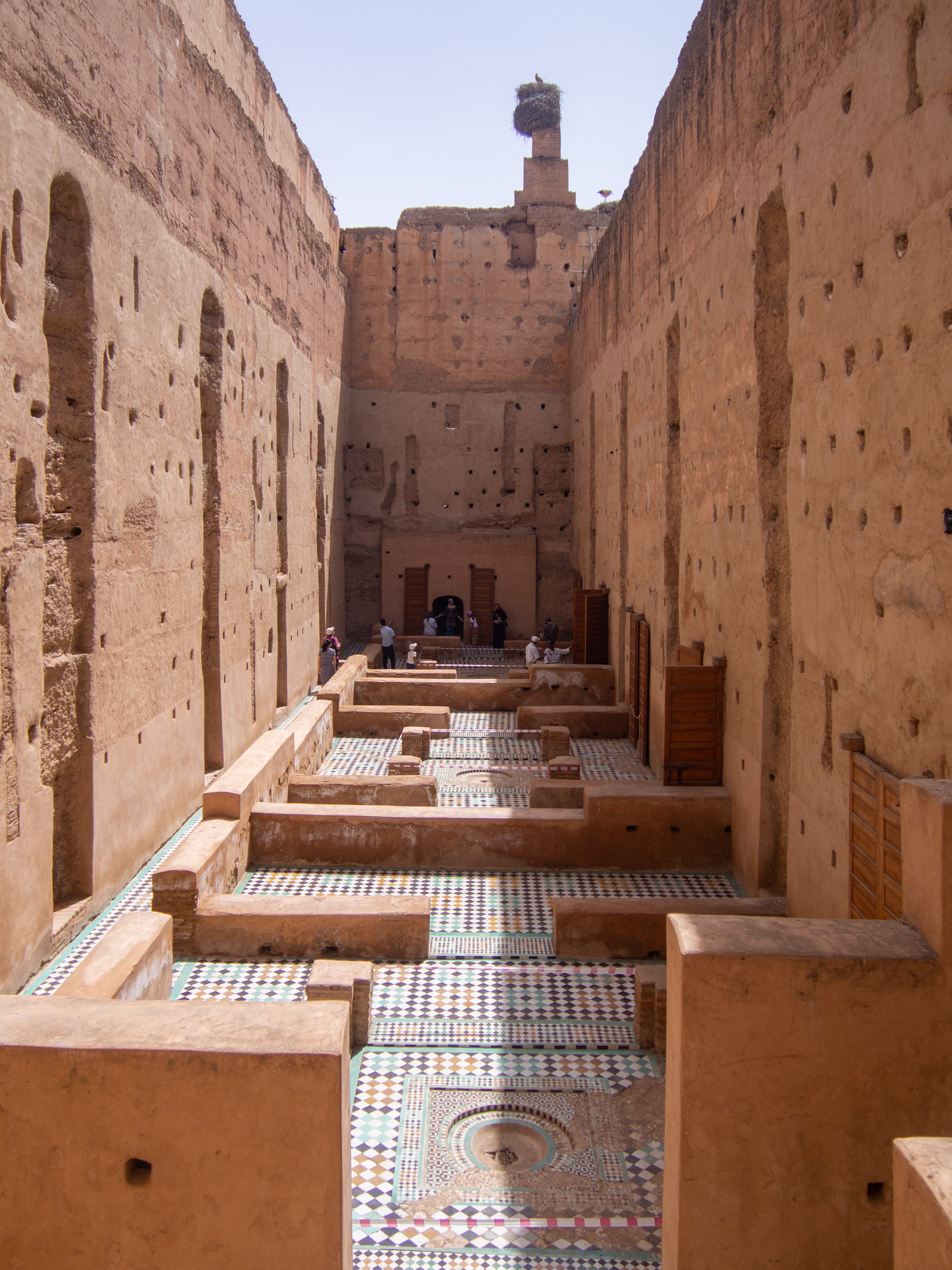
An annex on the northwest side of the palace which contained residential quarters, possibly for foreign ambassadors

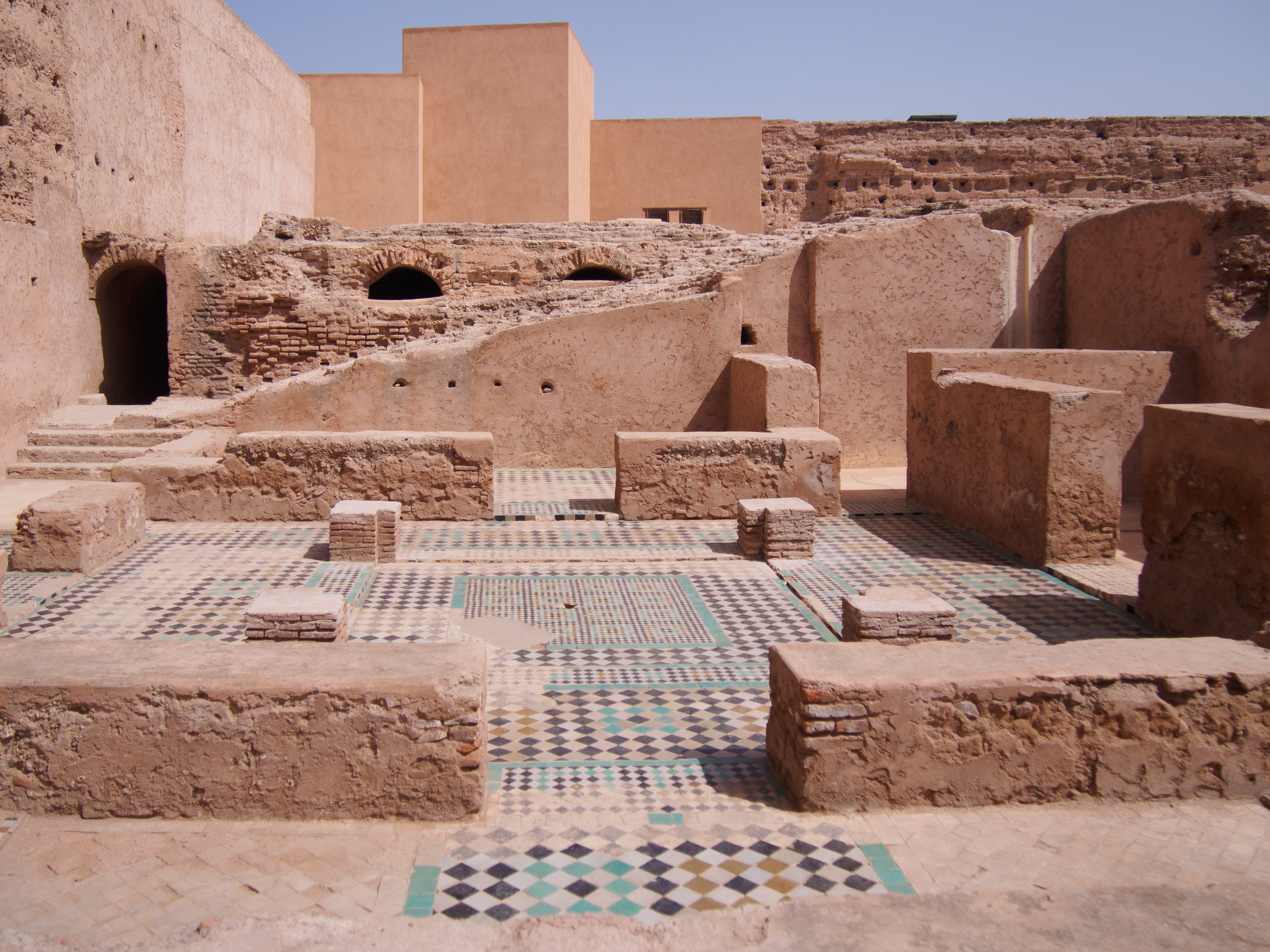
An annex area on the south side of the palace, probably including the remains of a bathhouse (hammam)

=== Materials and decoration ===
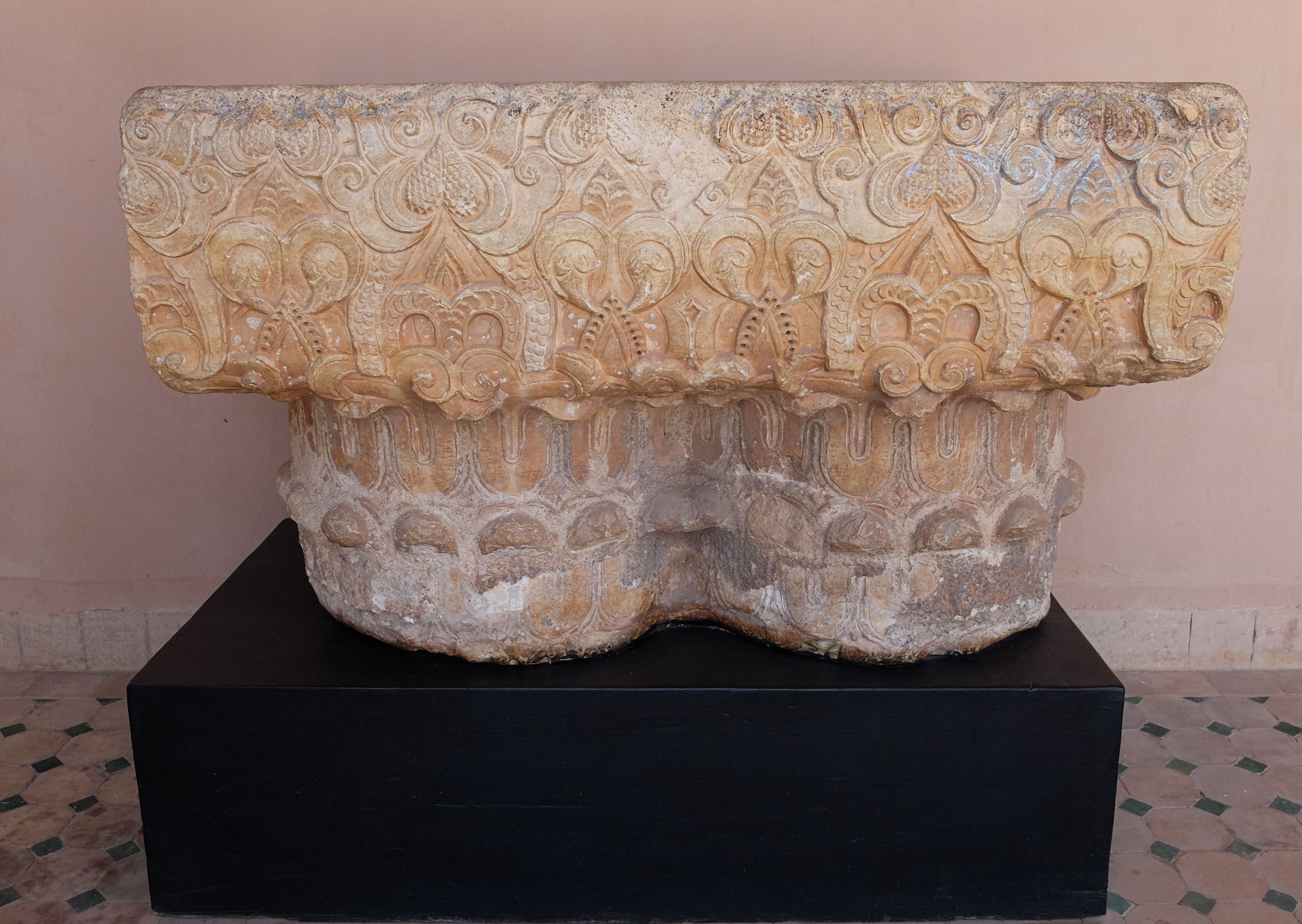
A double capital from some of the columns of the palace, carved in marble

The palace was a display of the skilled craftsmanship of the Saadian period, constructed using costly materials, including gold and onyx, with colonnades made of Italian marble exchanged with Italian merchants for their equivalent weight in sugar. Although the core structure of the palace's walls were made in rammed earth reinforced with a mixture of lime, the walls were covered with this type of elaborate decoration (though today they stand bare due to the palace's later ruin).

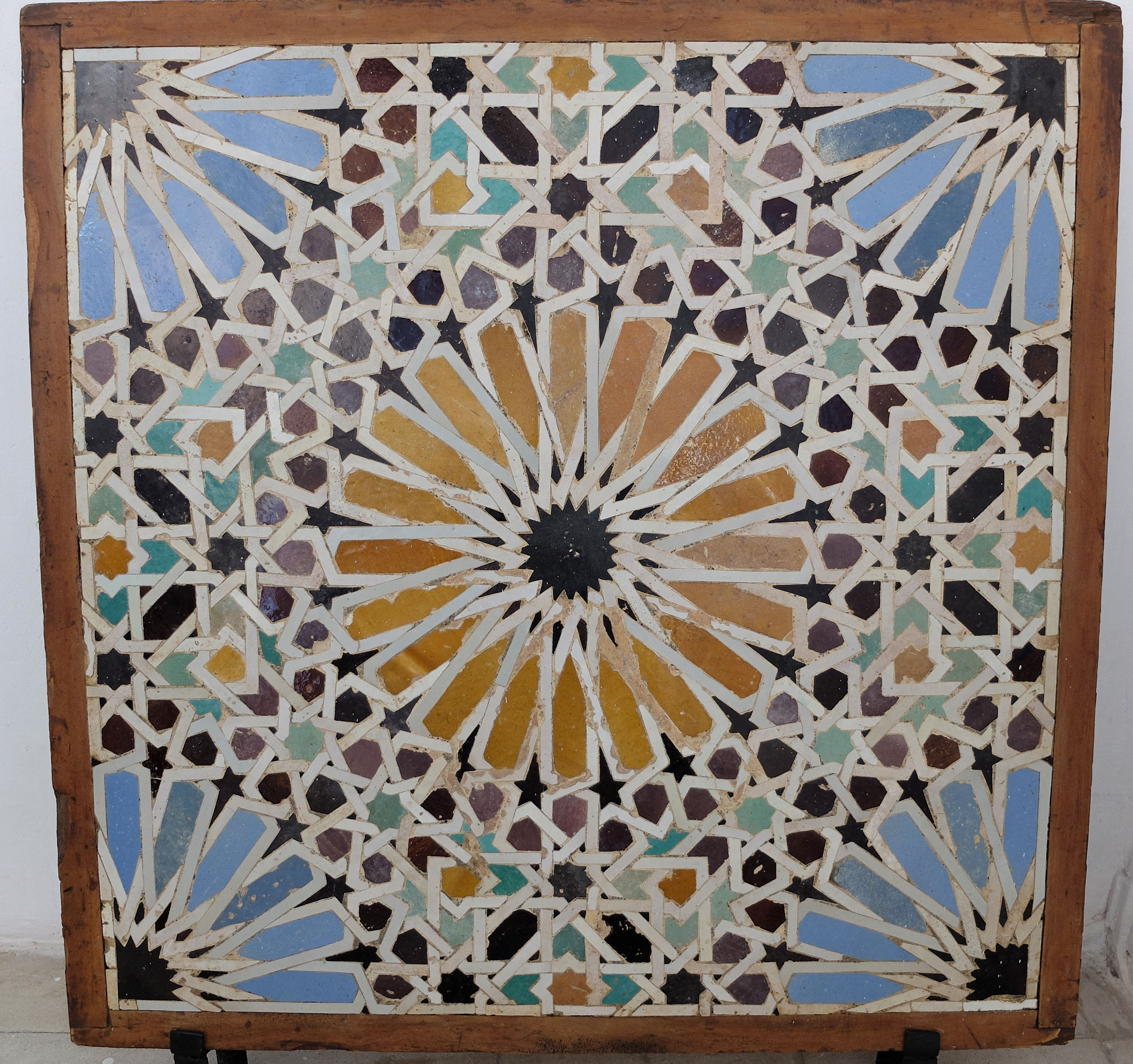
Preserved panel of zellij tiling from the palace, featuring a twenty-pointed star pattern

The floors were paved with marble and zellij (mosaic tilework), the ceilings and capitals of the columns were gilded, and the walls were covered in intricately carved stucco with calligraphic inscriptions. The fragments of zellij which have been uncovered in modern excavations in the palace show that the Saadian craftsmen had created geometric patterns of even greater complexity than those of previous periods, including examples of twenty-pointed stars. The various gardens and pools featured fountains with jets of water, reminiscent of the role of water in the Andalusian architecture of the Alhambra (which appears to have had a noted influence on Saadian architecture generally) and requiring an underground hydraulic infrastructure of vaults and channels.

== See also ==
- Saadian Tombs
- Ben Youssef Madrasa
- List of Moroccan royal residences
