= Muhammad ibn 'Askar =

Ibn Askar (Arabic: محمد بن عسكر الشفشاوني) or Abu Abdallah Mohammed ibn Ali ibn Omar ibn Husain ibn Misbah ibn Askar (1529–1579) was a Moroccan historian, author of Dawhat al-Nashir li-Mahasin man kana min al-Maghrib min Ahl al-Karn al-ashir, a hagiographic dictionary, composed about the year 1575 which gives a comprehensive picture of the Jazulliya order and its offshoots. Ibn Askar died in the battle of Ksar al-Kebir. (He is not to be confused with the Andalusian Ibn Askar (d. 1238), author of Alam Malaqa.)

== See also ==
- Ibn Jalal Tilimsani
