= Ahmad al-Manjur =

Moroccan scholar of theology and law and teacher

Personal life
- Born: Abu al-'Abbas Ahmad ibn 'Ali al-Manjur; 1520 Fes, Morocco
- Died: 1587 (aged 66–67) Fes, Morocco
- Notable work(s): Theological commentaries, Fahrasa (account of his scholarly career)
- Occupation: Scholar, Theologian, Jurist, Teacher

Religious life
- Religion: Islam
- Denomination: Sunni
- School: Maliki
- Creed: Ash'ari

Abu al-'Abbas Ahmad ibn 'Ali al-Manjur al-Miknasi al-Fasi (Arabic: أحمد المنجور; 1520–1587, born and died in Fes) was a Moroccan scholar of theology and law and a prominent teacher at the Qarawiyyin University. He is known to have educated qadis for several Moroccan towns. Between 1579 and 1585 he spent much time in Marrakesh, where he taught the Moroccan sultan Ahmad al-Mansur. He is the author of theological commentaries, and especially his fahrasa (account of his scholarly career) is of great renown. He was the father of the well-known writer Ahmad Ibn al-Qadi.

== See also ==
- List of Ash'aris
