= Skoura =

Coordinates: 31°03′38″N 6°33′20″W

Skoura ⵙⴽⵓⵔⴰ سكورة
- Town
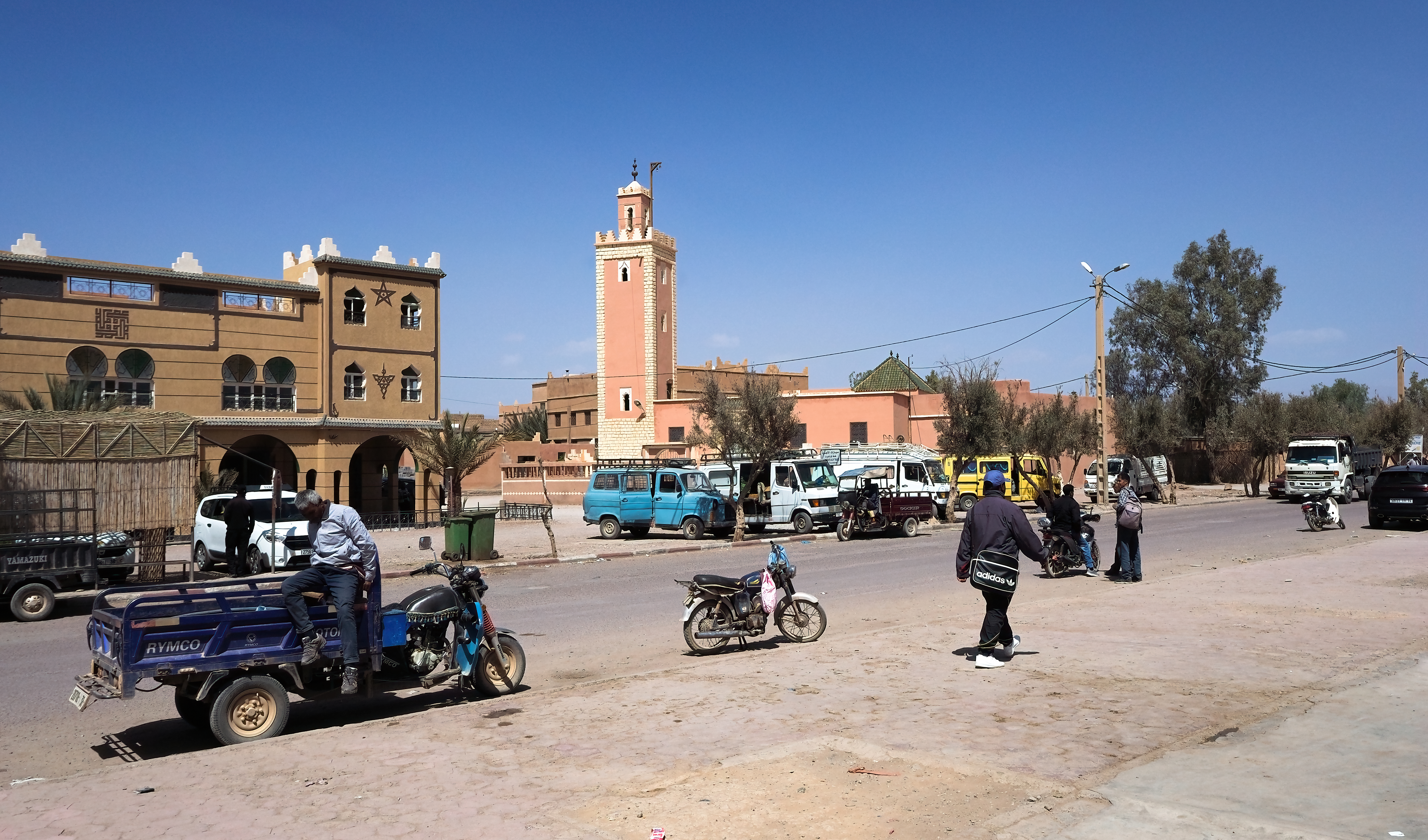
- Interactive map of Skoura
- Country: Morocco
- Region: Drâa-Tafilalet
- Province: Ouarzazate Province

Population (2014)
  - Total: 4,332 (town center); 24,055 (region)
- Time zone: UTC+0 (GMT)

Skoura (Tamazight: ⵙⴽⵓⵔⴰ, Arabic: سكورة) is a town in Ouarzazate Province, Drâa-Tafilalet, Morocco. It consists of a modern town as well as a historical oasis and palmeraie with traditional rammed-earth architecture.

== Etymology ==
The oral tradition tells that Skoura was a long time ago a large lake populated by various species of birds, the most important being the partridge, animal which is called in Amazigh Askour or Taskourt for its feminine.

== Geography ==
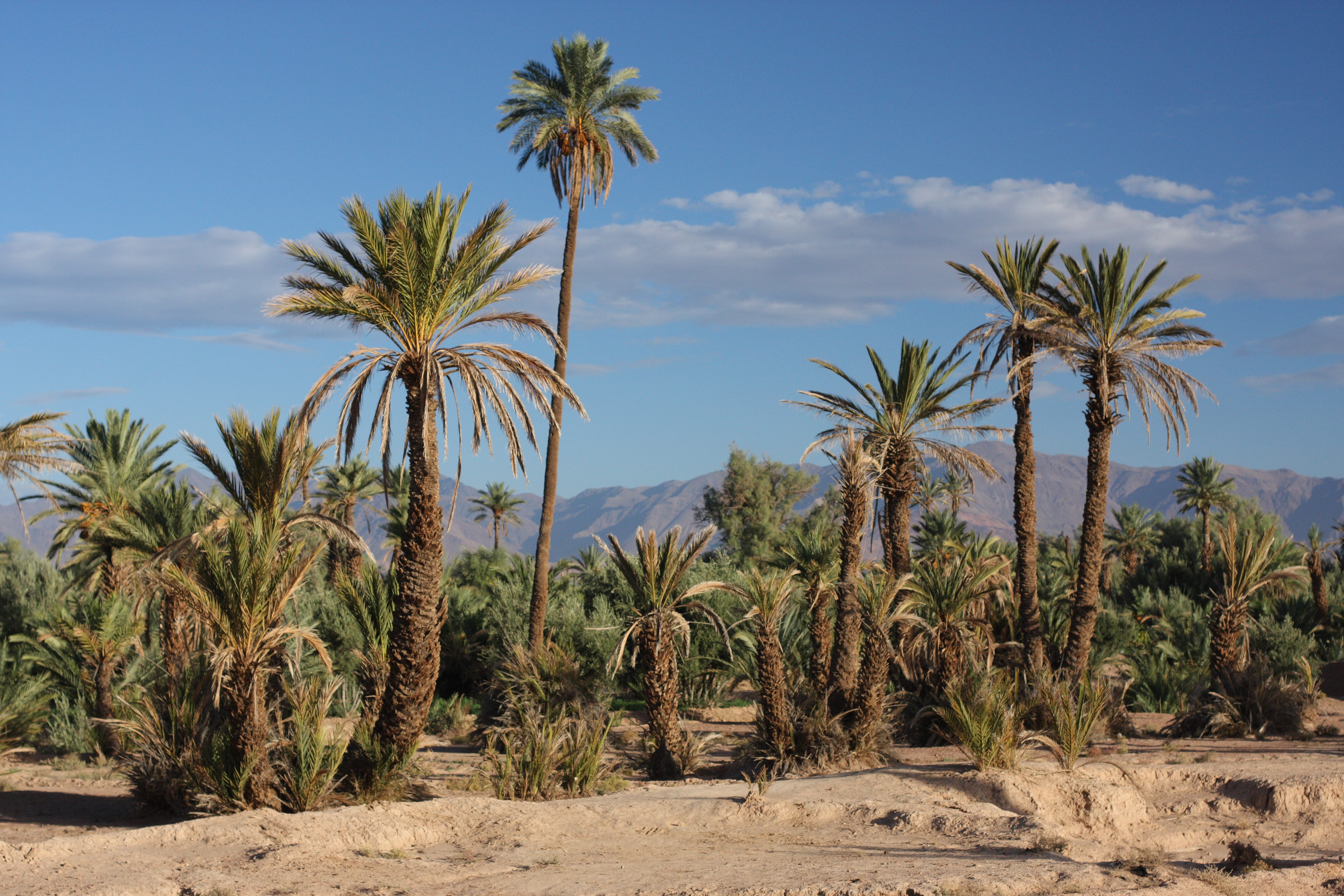
The palmeraie of the oasis

Skoura consists of a historic fertile oasis lined with immense palm groves (a "palmeraie"), existing at the confluence of several rivers and streams descending from the central High Atlas mountains. Within the oasis, a few of these rivers join together to form the river known as Oued el-Hajjaj, which in turn joins the Oued Dadès (Dadès River) a short distance further south. The main modern town of Skoura today exists on the eastern edge of the oasis, along the main road from Ouarzazate.

Skoura is also the name of a Geological Basin.

== Agriculture ==
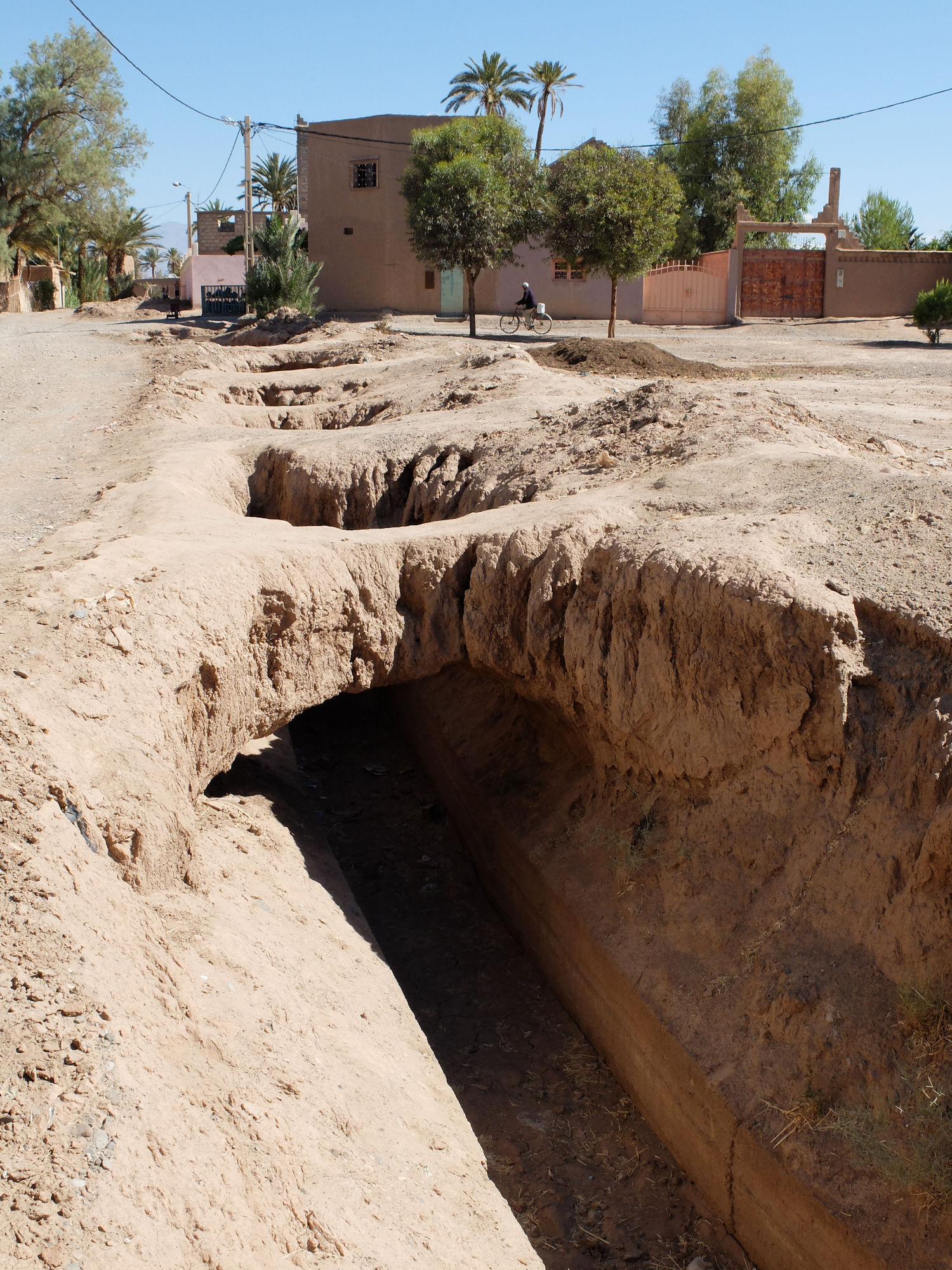
Example of a khettara or underground canal in the oasis

Many of these rivers remain dry outside the spring period, which has required a careful and elaborate system of irrigation and water preservation within the oasis. This system draws from both surface waters and subterranean waters. A series of khettaras (a type of underground canal) draws subterranean waters from the phreatic table in the higher-elevation regions of the mountain foothills and brings them to reservoirs in the oasis. At the same time, a series of dams along the main rivers allows for some of the surface waters to be diverted as well. From these reservoirs water is then distributed via a network of irrigation canals (seguias) to the various agricultural plots. This water supply system was collectively shared and maintained by the entire population of the oasis, with landowners agreeing to take turns to receive water for their crops. Alongside the palms a variety of common crops were grown such as dates, other fruit trees, vegetables, and cereals.

Before the 1970s, the agricultural fields in Skoura decreased by approximately 11 square kilometers, potentially due to the redirection of surface water for irrigation purposes. There's a likelihood that the present size of Saharan oases is smaller compared to their historical size. Given the pressing challenges arising from climate change and excessive use, it's crucial to promptly investigate the underlying issues causing this fragility.

== Demographics ==
According to the 2014 national census, the total population of the Skoura area (the commune called Skoura Ahl El Oust) was 24,055. The main town centre of Skoura had a population of 4,332.

Historically, the population of the oasis was composed of many layers of immigration and ethnic groups. Some of the oldest known groups were Berbers (Amazigh) such as the Masmuda, followed by Arab tribes like the Banu Hilal and Banu Ma'qil. Later groups included Black Sub-Saharan Africans, many of them descended from slaves who were imported in various periods. One of these were the Haratin, who had useful agricultural expertise. Another groups were known as the 'Abid, members of the Black Guard of the early Alaouite sultans or other slaves often placed in charge of households, many of whom are part of religious brotherhoods characterized as the Gnawa. A long-standing Jewish community also existed in the oasis, possibly since its foundation, and historically participated in many of the same activities and even the same festivals as the Muslim population. The Jewish community has left physical traces such as tombs and cemeteries. There were also prominent religious Muslim families who were leaders of local Sufi zawiyas (shrines or religious centers) and held a special status among the rest of the population.

== Architecture ==
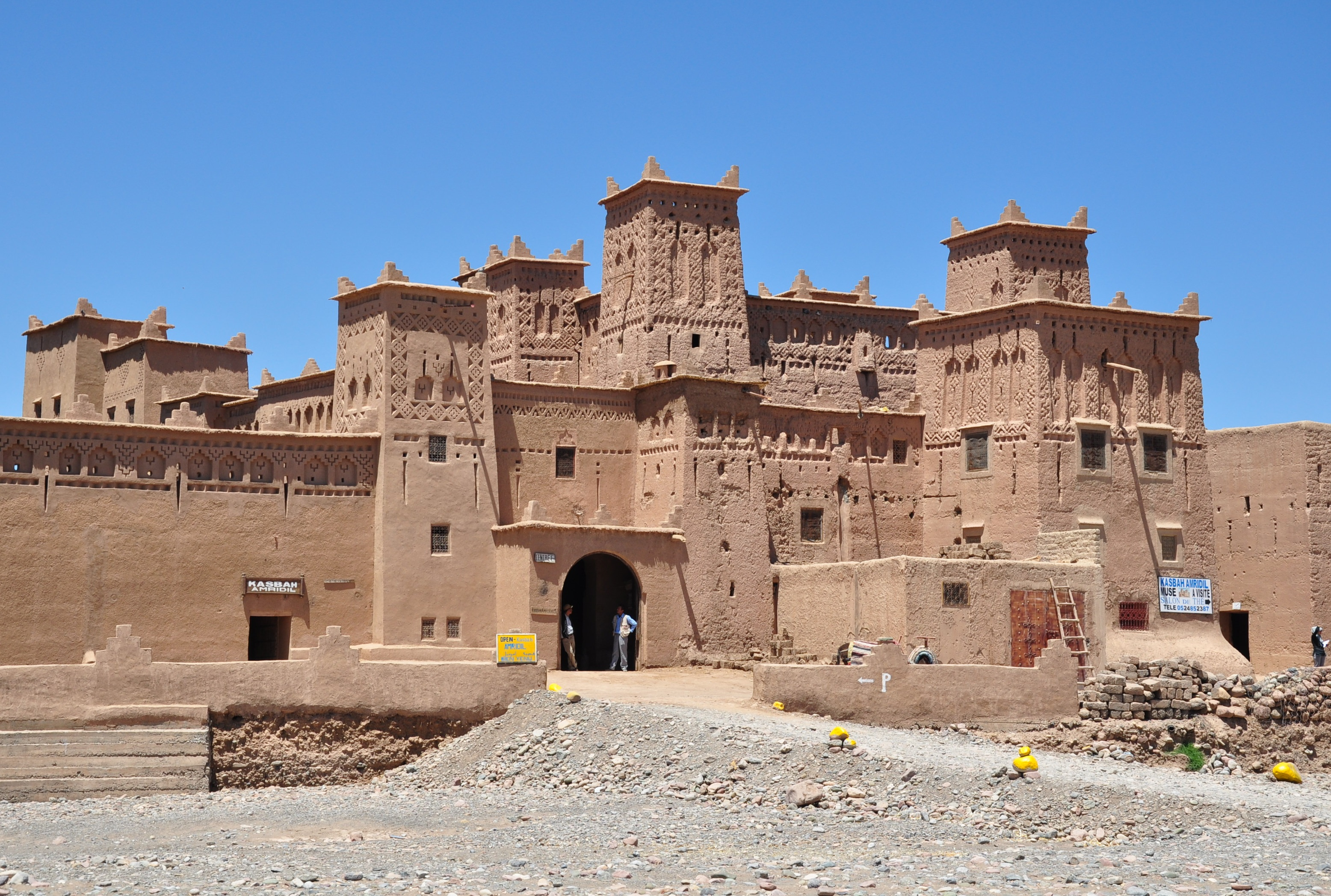
Kasbah Amridil

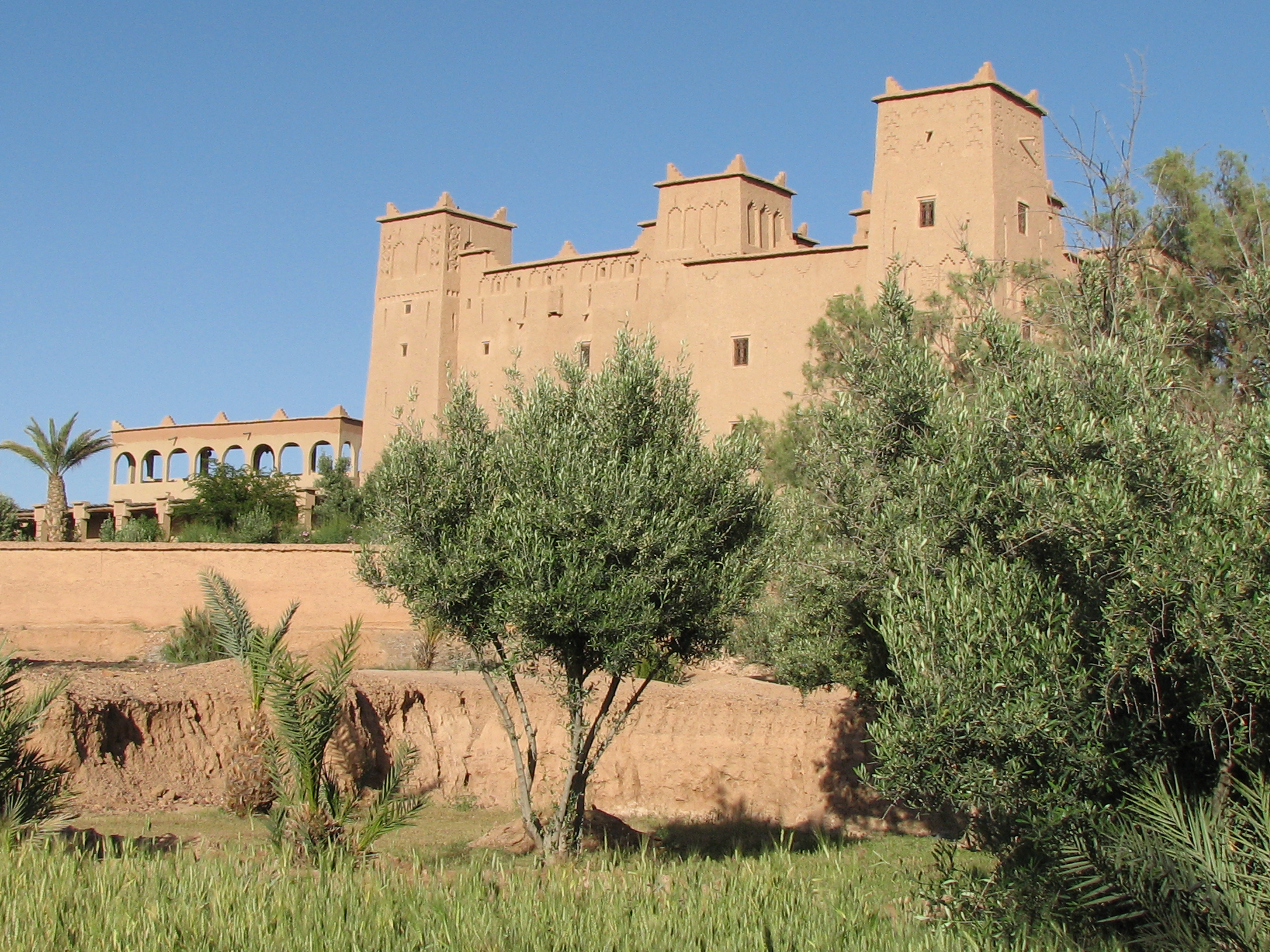
Kasbah Aït Ben Moro, another example of a well-preserved kasbah

The oasis and palmeraie is dotted with many traditional kasbahs (fortified family mansions) and ksour (fortified villages) built in rammed earth, dating from various periods in the last few centuries, some of which are crumbling today while others have been recently restored or converted to new uses. The typical form of a kasbah is a tall square-base structure with four corner towers, often with decorative motifs carved into their upper parts, although other annexes and structures may be attached and part of the same residential complex. The decorative motifs in Skoura are among some of the most elaborate in this kind of architecture. The most famous is the Kasbah Amridil: a ksar since the 17th century to which a towering kasbah was added at the end of the 19th century. The Kasbah Aït Ben Moro, cited as one of the best-preserved, originally dates from the 17th century, but was restored and converted to a hotel at the end of the 20th century. Along with the Kasbah Ait Ben Moro, various other kasbahs are named after the notable families that lived in them, such as the Kasbah Aït Ben Moro, Kasbah Mohamed Ben Hamadi, Kasbah Ait Abou, Kasbah Si Abd El Kebir, etc.
