= Skoura Ahl El Oust =

- commune
- Interactive map of Skoura Ahl El Oust
- Country: Morocco
- Region: Souss-Massa-Drâa
- Province: Ouarzazate

Population (2004)
  - Total: 22,880
- Time zone: UTC+0 (GMT)

Skoura Ahl El Oust is a commune in the Ouarzazate Province of the Souss-Massa-Drâa administrative region of Morocco. It contains the main town of Skoura. At the time of the 2004 census, the commune had a total population of 22880 people living in 3445 households.
