= Kasbah Amridil =

Historical building in Morocco

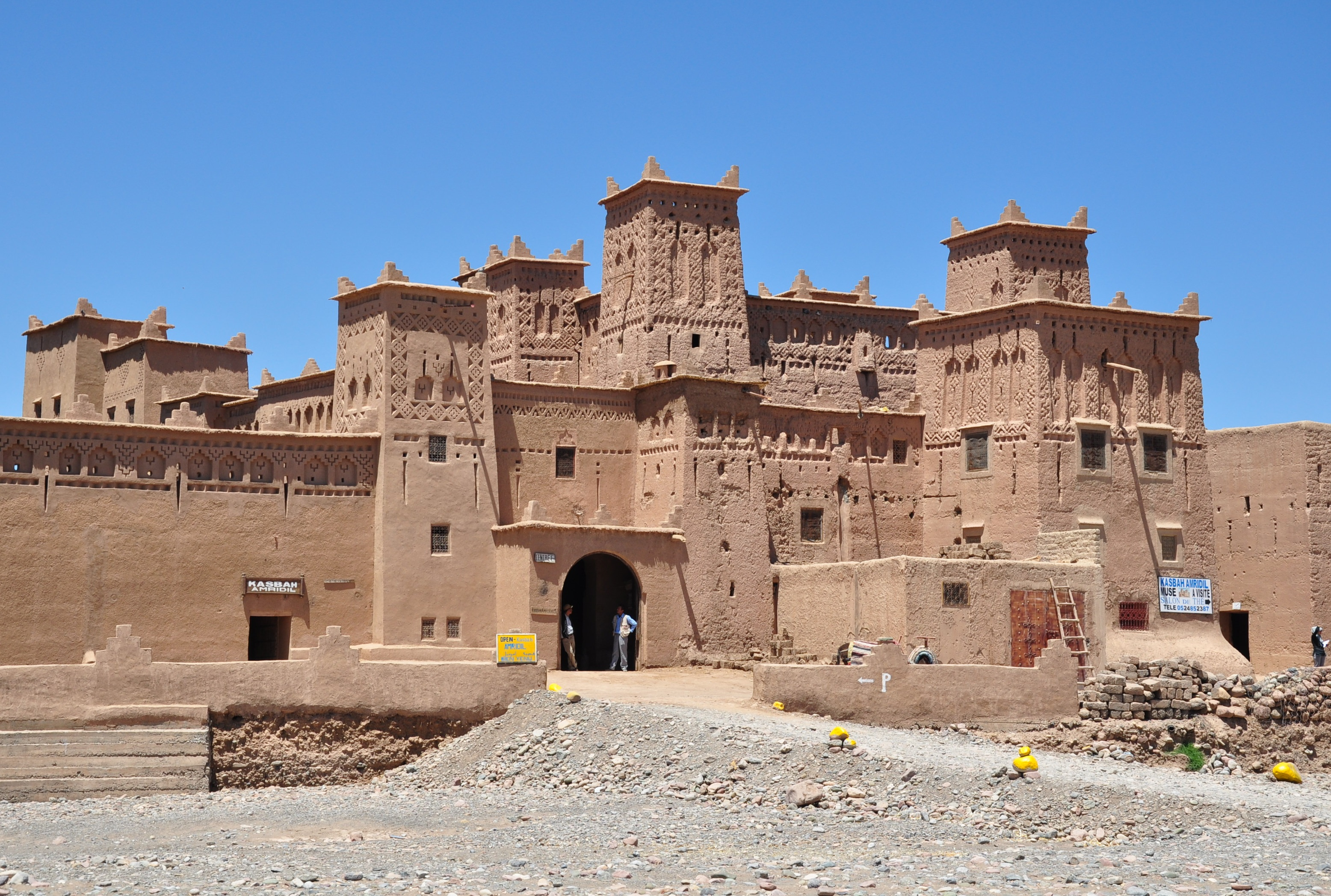
- Exterior of the kasbah
- Coordinates: 31°02′46.9″N 6°34′52.5″W
- Founded: 17th century (ksar)
- Built: 19th century (kasbah)
- Built for: M'hamed Ben Brahim Nasiri
- Architectural style(s): Moroccan (Berber) architecture
- Owner: Nasiri family

Kasbah Amridil is a historic fortified residence or kasbah (tighremt in Amazigh) in the oasis of Skoura, in Morocco. It is considered among the most impressive kasbahs of its kind in Morocco and was formerly featured on the Moroccan 50 dirham note.

== History ==
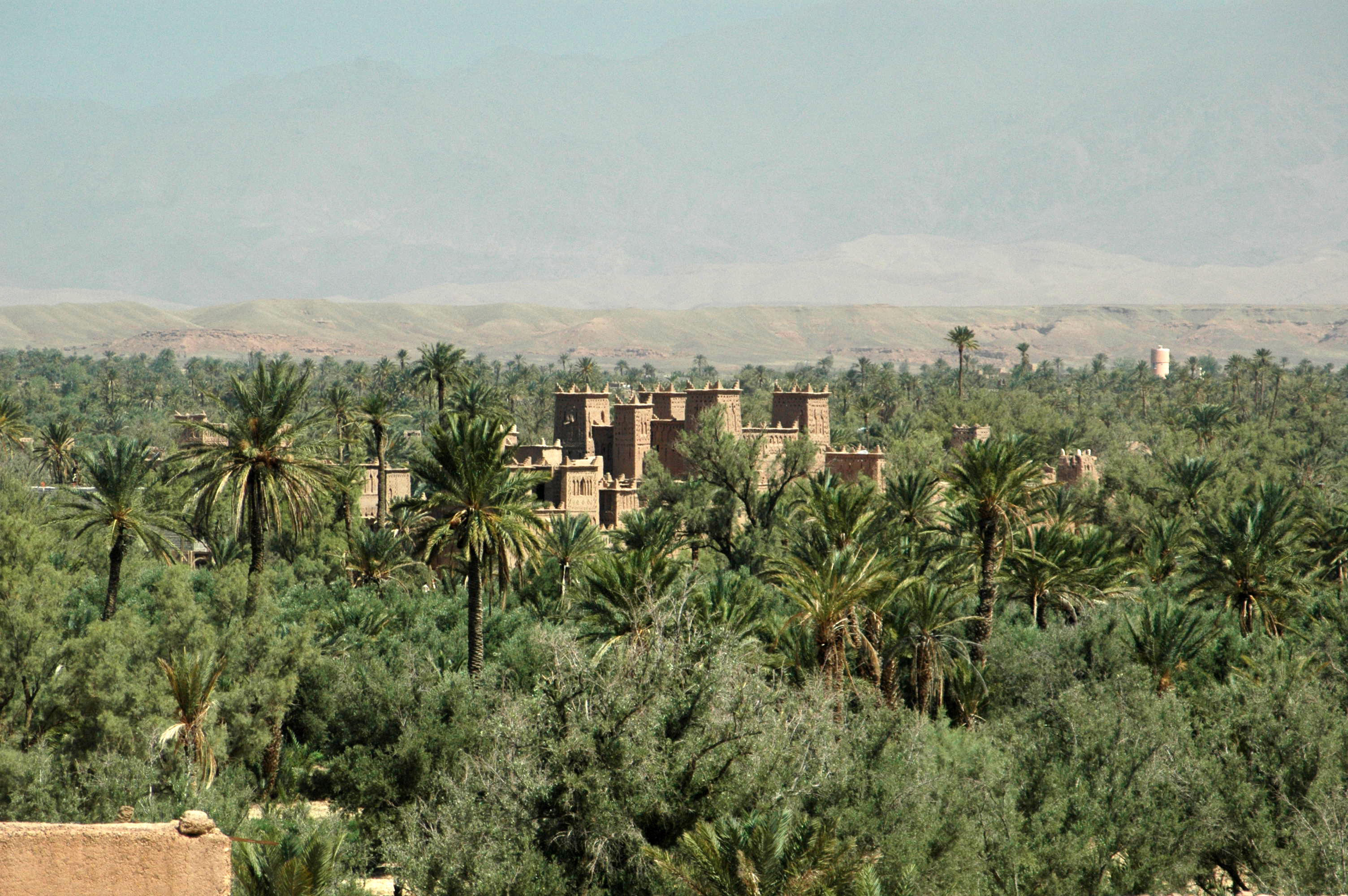
View of the kasbah from afar, amidst the palmeraie

The kasbah was originally founded in the 17th century. It initially consisted of a fortified village, a ksar, occupying a strategic location along the river and at the entrance to the Skoura palmeraie. Towards the end of the 19th century M'hamed Ben Brahim Nasiri, a faqih from a local privileged family living in the ksar (descendants of the family associated with the prestigious Zawiya Nasiriyya in Tamegroute), was chosen by Madani El Glaoui (older brother of Thami el Glaoui) to educate his sons in reading the Qur'an. As compensation, El Glaoui commissioned his craftsmen to build Nasiri a tighremt (fortified mansion) at the ksar.

Today the kasbah is the most prominent structure and takes up the long southern part of the complex, while the ruined ksar (the former village) occupies the northern section. The kasbah made an appearance in the 1962 film Lawrence of Arabia. It is still owned and maintained by the Nasiri family to this day. The family continues to live in one part of the kasbah while other parts have been restored to serve as a museum showcasing the traditional architecture of the building and local traditional artifacts, including tools, an olive press, a bread oven, and an old well.

== Architecture ==
The building follows some of the typical design elements of oasis architecture in the predominantly Berber regions of southern Morocco: it is made from rammed earth or mudbrick and has square corner towers with geometric decoration. The original ksar (village) corresponded to the walled enclosure still occupying the northern section of the site, but it is ruined today. The Kasbah itself (or tighremt), a large late 19th-century mansion for the Nasiri family and (historically) their servants, occupies the rest of the site, stretching towards the south along the river. Although it has various courtyards and elements, the most imposing structure is the main house, an almost square building with four corner towers (though a fifth tower has since been added on the south side of the structure). A garden has been added to the courtyard in the southern section of the kasbah, although this is a design element imported from Marrakesh during recent restorations.

This main house rises on four levels arranged around a central courtyard or patio, the wust ad-dar ("middle of the house"). In the first two levels the courtyard is covered by a roof, while on the third level it is open to the air and the fourth level consists of the upper-floor terrace running around it. The entrance of the tighremt is on the first (ground) level and is accessed through an outer courtyard on its east side. A vestibule room just inside the entrance gives access to the central courtyard and to the stairway leading to the upper floors. The rooms on the first level were used for the storage of food, goods, and animals. The second level above this was used for domestic purposes, mainly as kitchens, as well as to store other types of food like oil, fruits, and grain. The third level, which was centered around the open-air patio, is where the actual living space began. The rooms here are enlivened with ochre and white paint and some sections are open to the patio through a gallery of arches, allowing more light to penetrate. The rooms are also more or less interchangeable rather than having predefined functions – they could be furnished and refurnished to suit different needs. The fourth level, the terrace above this, featured a sundial and gave access to the towers.

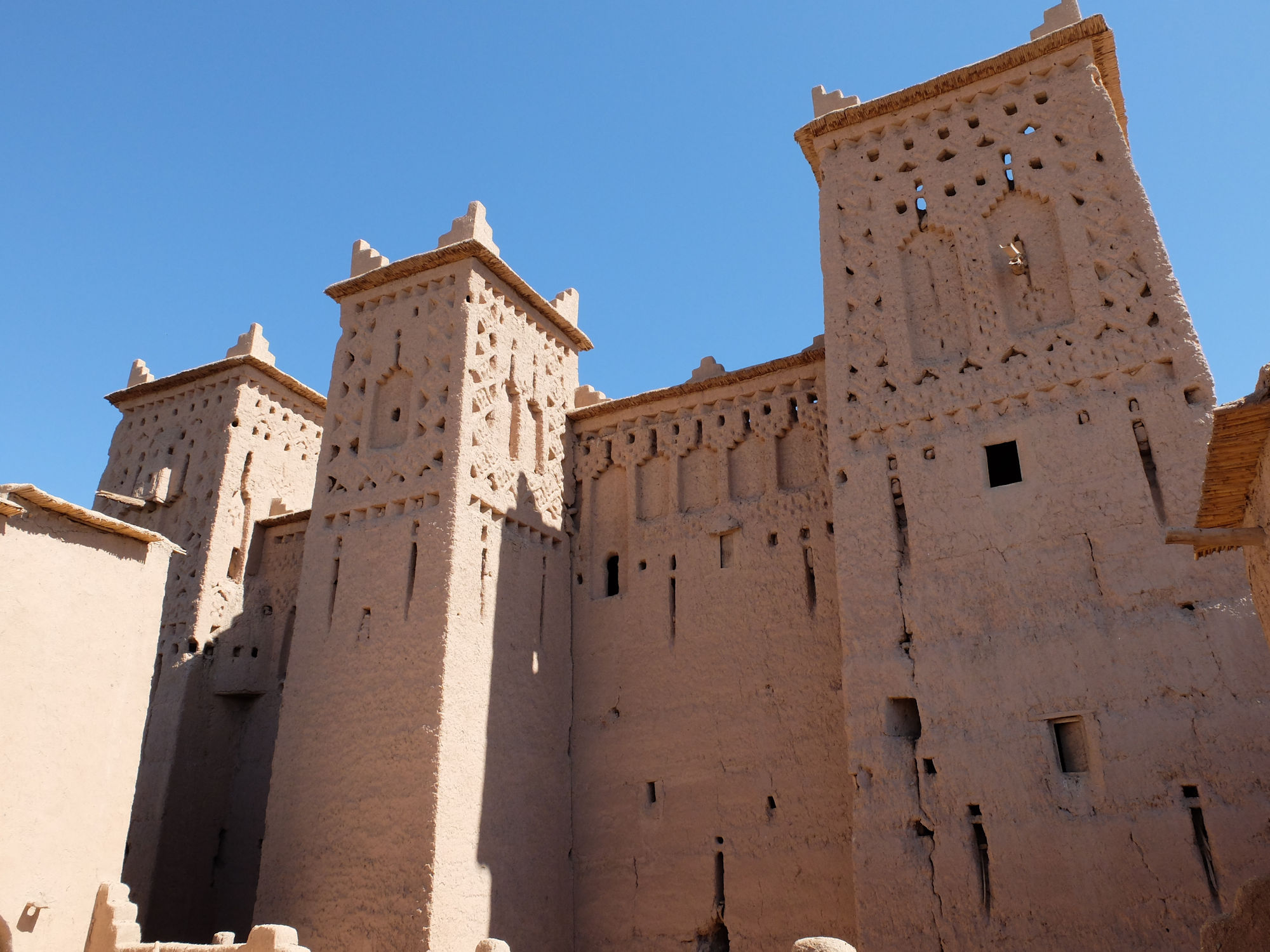
View of the main house inside the kasbah: a typical square-based structure with four corner towers, though a fifth tower (the middle tower seen here) was added after the original construction

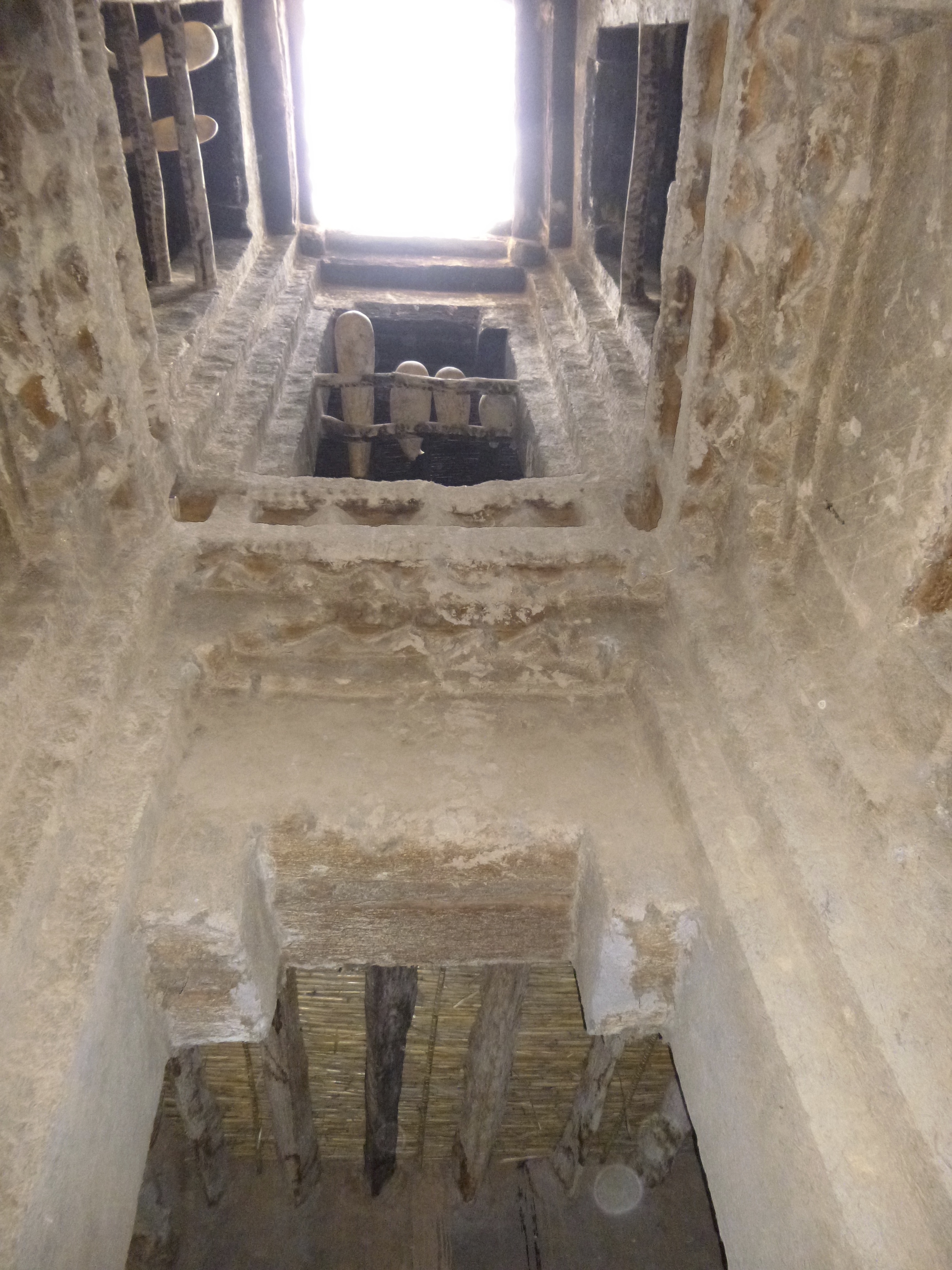
View from the lower levels up to the skylight that opens in the middle of the upper-floor patio, inside the main kasbah residence

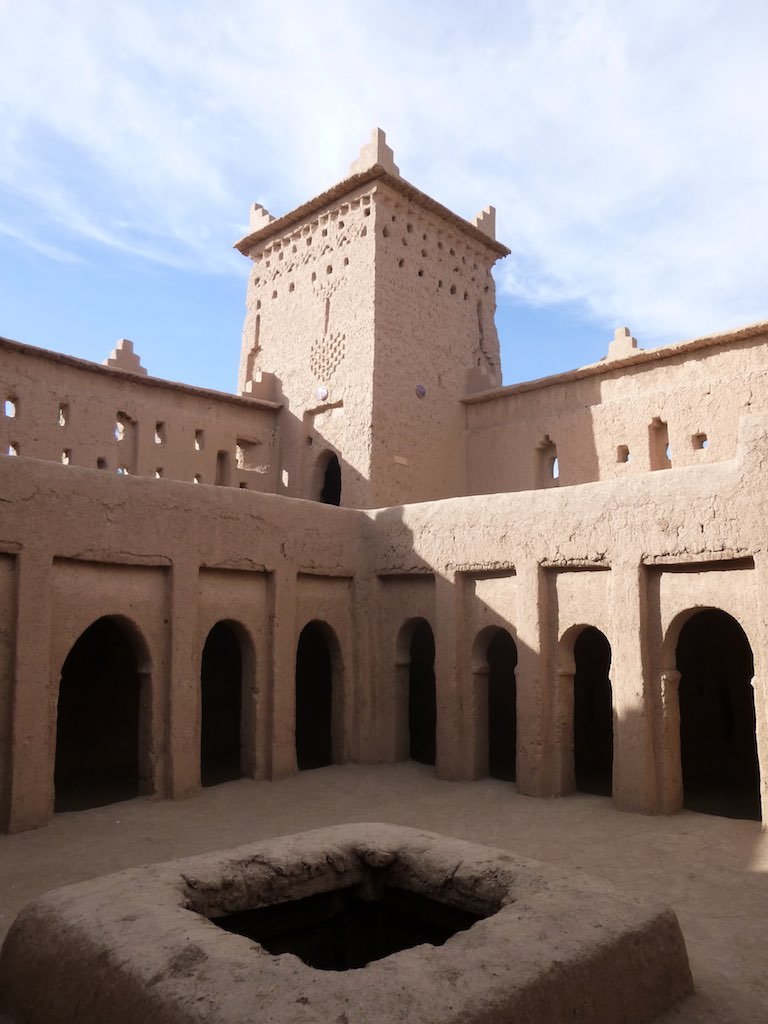
The central patio of the upper floors, inside the main kasbah residence

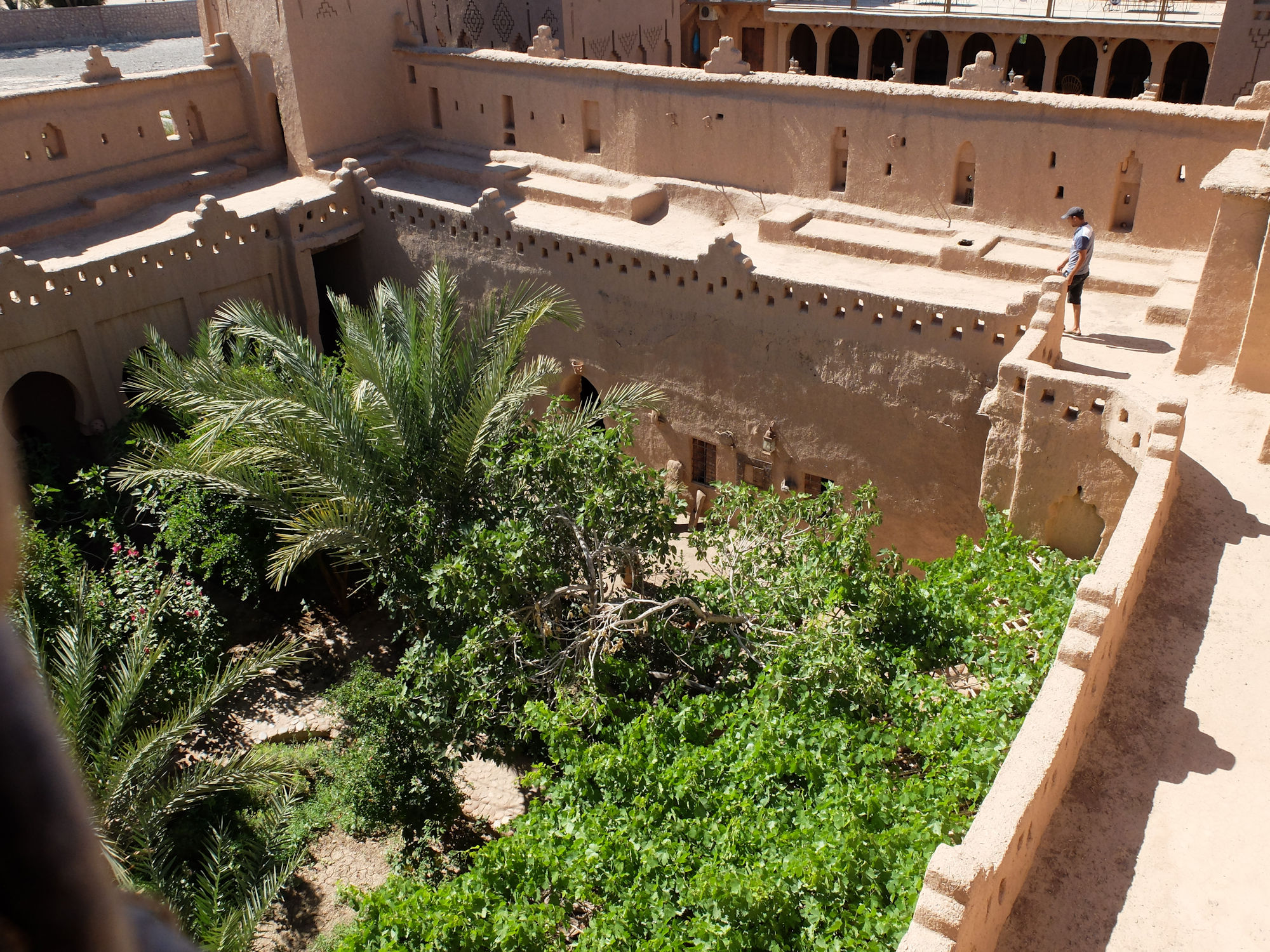
A restored section of the kasbah complex with a newer courtyard garden

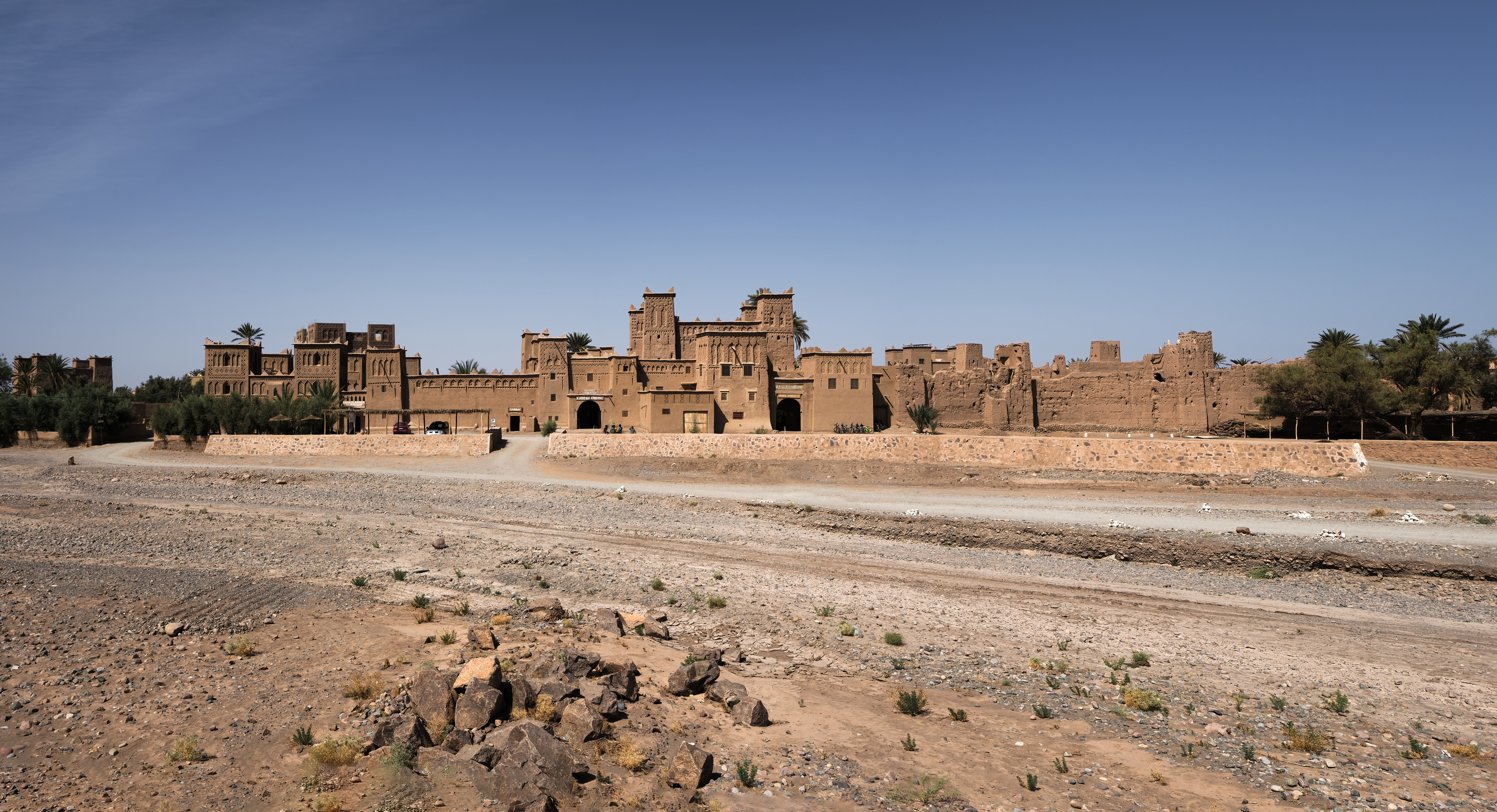
Complete view of Kasbah Amridil

== See also ==
- Moroccan architecture
- Kasbah Taourirt
