= Alcazaba of the Alhambra =

Fortress in Granada, Spain

Coordinates: 37°10′37.4″N 3°35′20.6″W

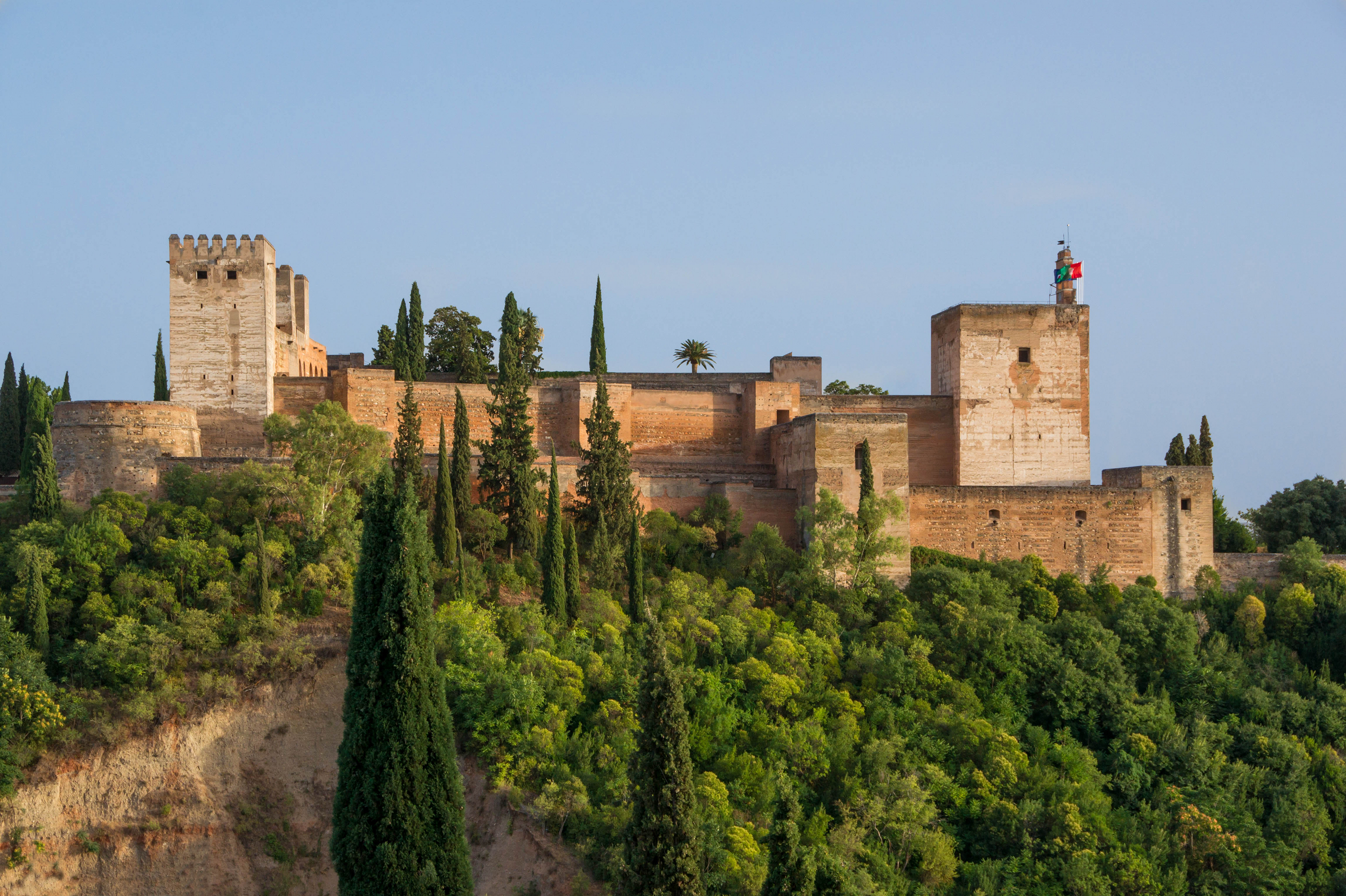
The Alcazaba, seen from the north

The Alcazaba (Spanish: Alcazaba; Arabic: القصبة, romanized: al-qaṣabah, lit. 'citadel') is a fortress at the western tip of the Alhambra in Granada, Spain. Its name comes from the Arabic term al-qaṣabah ('the citadel' or kasbah), which became Alcazaba in Spanish. It is the oldest surviving part of the Alhambra, having been built by Muhammad I Ibn al-Ahmar, the founder of the Nasrid dynasty, after 1238. It stands on the site of an earlier fortress built by the Zirid kingdom of Granada in the 11th century.

== History ==
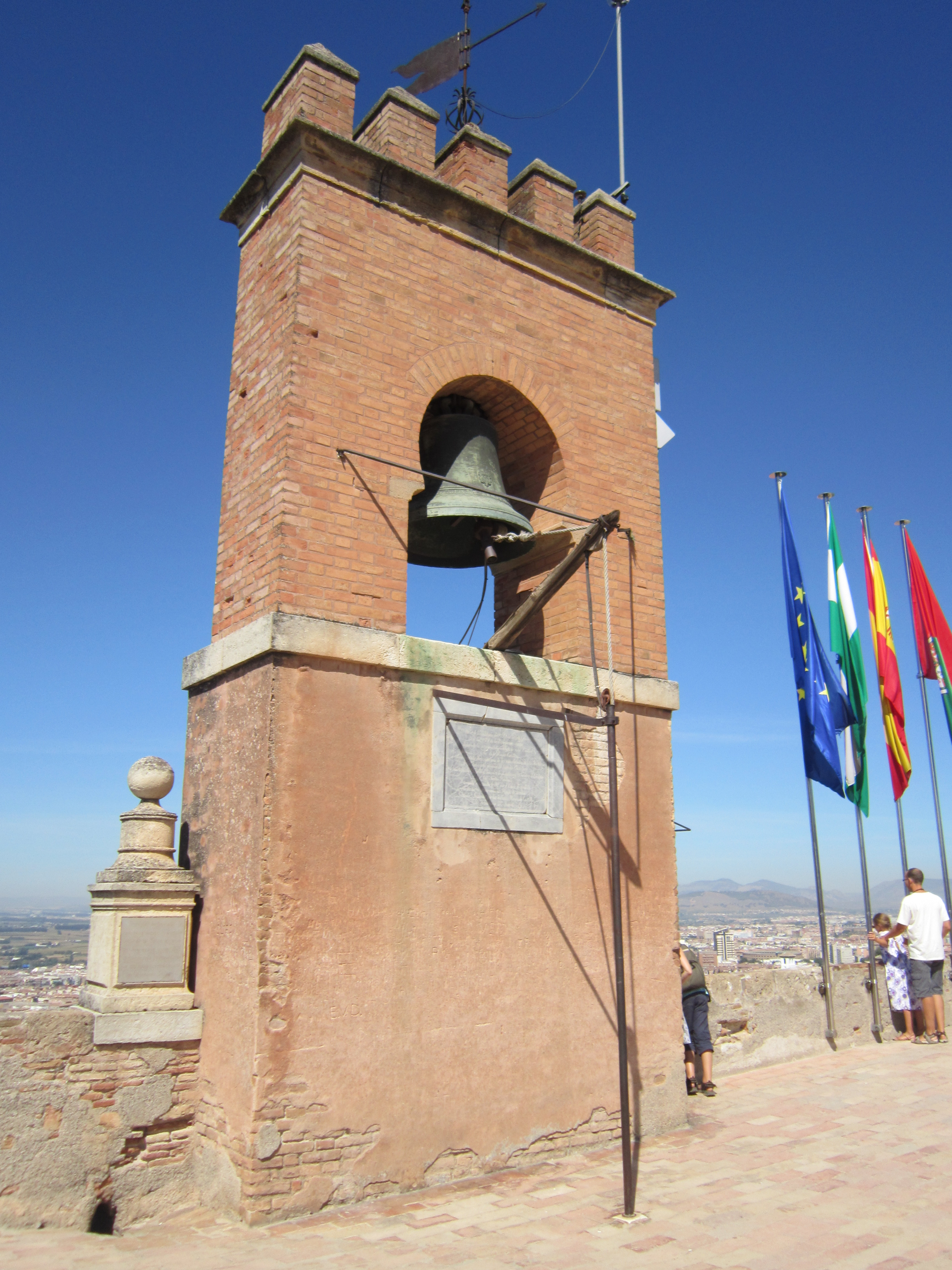
Flags and historic bell on top of the Torre de la Vela today

The Alcazaba is situated at the western tip of the Sabika hill, a promontory projecting from the foothills of the Sierra Nevada. It is a natural defensive position and was fortified from the 9th century onward. A fortress (ḥiṣn) named Ġarnāṭa (also transliterated as Gharnāṭa) existed on the south side of the Darro River. The settlement here had a mainly Jewish population and thus was also known as Gharnāṭat al-Yahūd ("Gharnāṭa of the Jews"). During the first Taifas period in the 11th century Granada became the center of a local Zirid kingdom whose rulers lived in a citadel and palace on the Albaicín hill known as the al-Qaṣaba al-Qadīma ("Old Citadel" or "Old Palace"). It was connected to two other fortresses on the Sabika and Mauror hills to the south. The fortress on the Sabika hill was known as the al-Qasaba al-Jadida ("New Citadel"). It was probably of modest proportions compared to the present Alcazaba. Its water supply was guaranteed by a cistern on site as well as by a wall with towers that descended down to the Darro River, allowing soldiers to safely collect water and bring it back up to the fortress.

In 1145 the fortress on the Sabika hill was used as a refuge by forces opposing the Almoravids. It was used this way again in 1167 by opponents of the Almohads. After capturing it, the Almohads undertook some repairs to the damaged fortress. In 1238 Ibn al-Ahmar (Muhammad I) made Granada the capital of a new emirate. He initially settled in the old Zirid citadel on the Albaicín hill, but after a few months he moved to the Sabika hill, where he founded a new citadel and began construction of the Alhambra. He re-used some of the foundations of the earlier Zirid fortress and built the new Alcazaba over them, enclosed the rest of the hill with a perimeter wall, and completed an aqueduct in the same year, which enabled the area's subsequent development. Ibn al-Ahmar did not have time to complete any major new palaces and he may have initially lived in what is now called the Torre del Homenaje in the Alcazaba, before later moving to a modest house on the site of the current Palace of Charles V. The Alcazaba is now the oldest surviving part of the Alhambra. Some of the foundations of the Alcazaba's northern inner wall probably still date back to the Zirid period. Among later Nasrid additions, Yusuf I (r. 1333–1354) added what is now called the Torre Quebrada ('Broken Tower') to the eastern wall of the fortress in the 14th century.

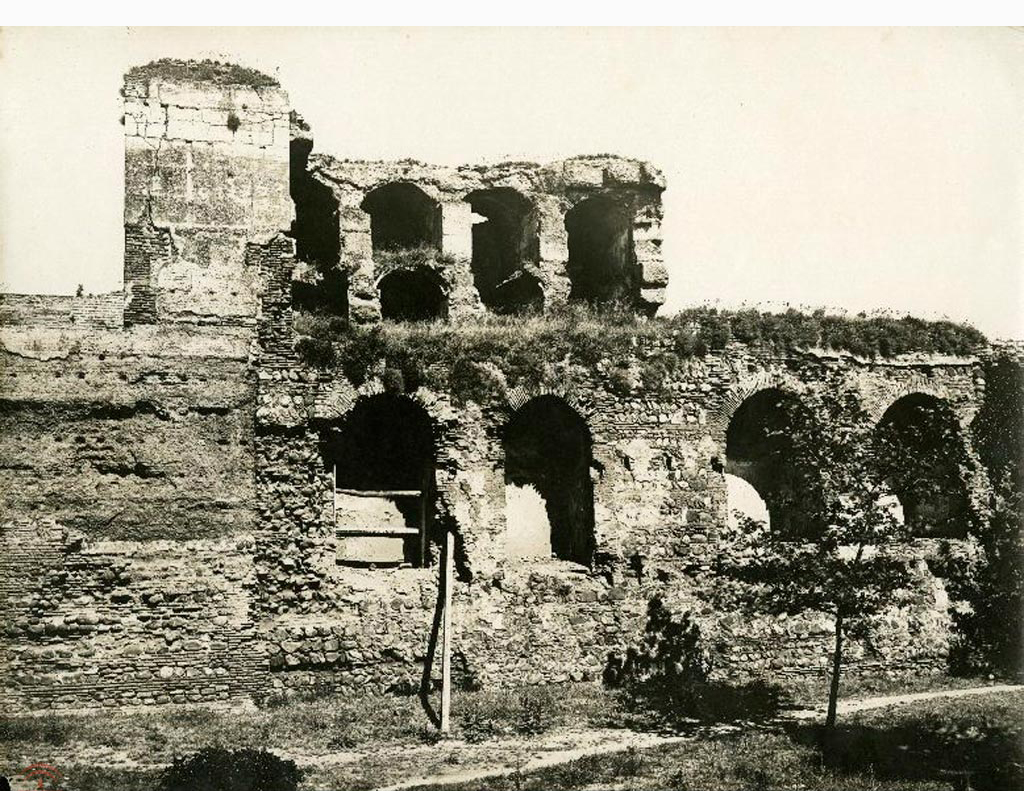
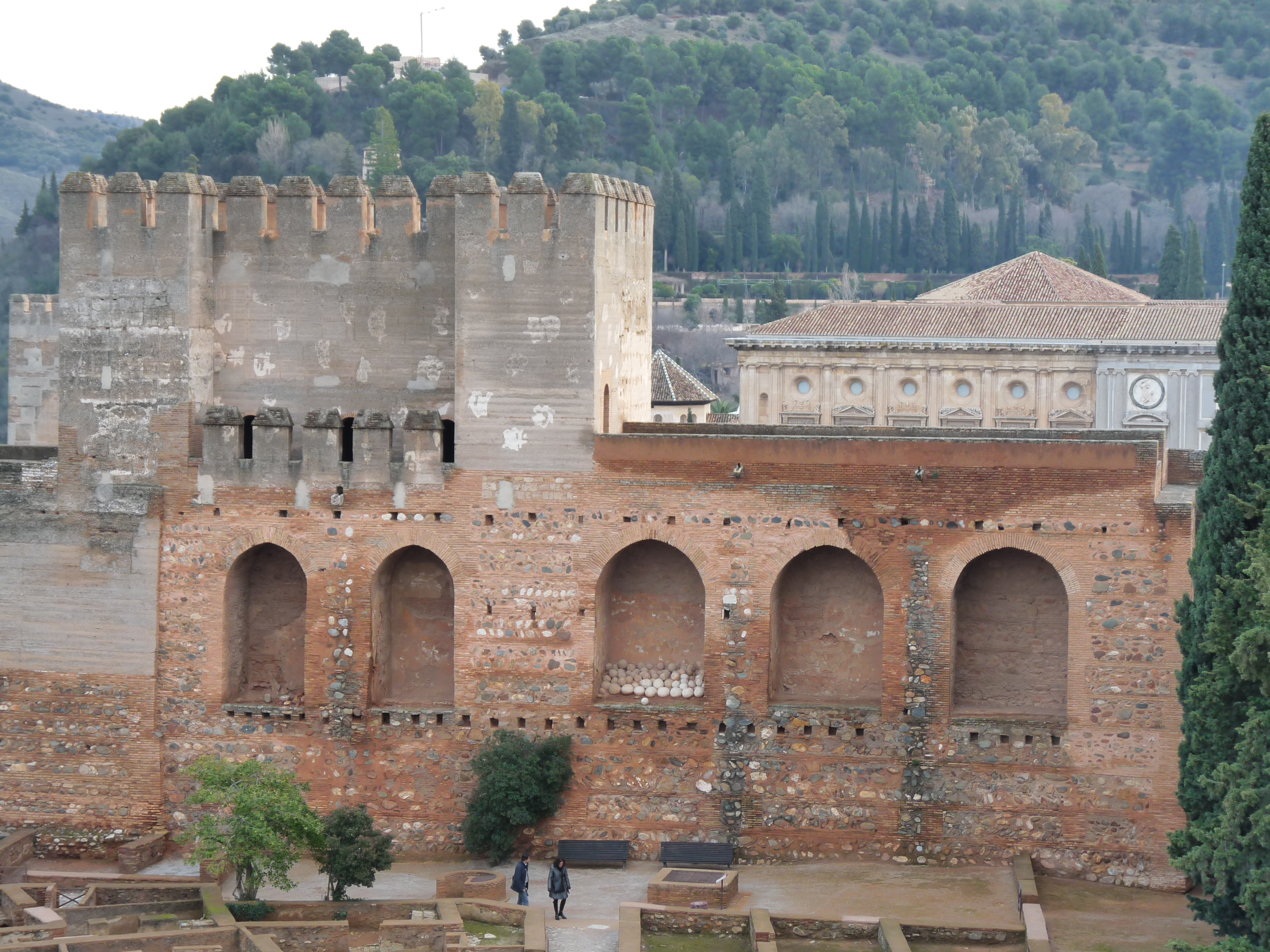
The Alcazaba before and after 20th-century restorations

According to tradition, when Granada and the Alhambra were surrendered to the Catholic Monarchs on January 2, 1492, the flag of Castile was raised that same day over the Torre de la Vela in the Alcazaba. Multiple modifications and additions to the fortress were made by the Spanish in the 16th century to fortify it against gunpowder artillery weapons which had become a regular part of warfare by this time. These changes began in 1492 and were mostly completed by around 1589. Despite all these major fortification works, the fortress did not see much action in any military confrontations. After the end of the Morisco rebellion of 1568-1571 and the expulsion of the Morisco population in 1609 there were few threats to Granada or the Alhambra.

In the early 20th century archaeologists cleared the interior of the fortress of rubble and excavated the remains of the urban area there. Repairs and restorations were also carried out on the rest of the fortress in modern times, particularly under the direction of Leopoldo Torres Balbás, who was the architectural conservator of the site from 1923 to 1936.

== Description ==
=== General layout and structure ===
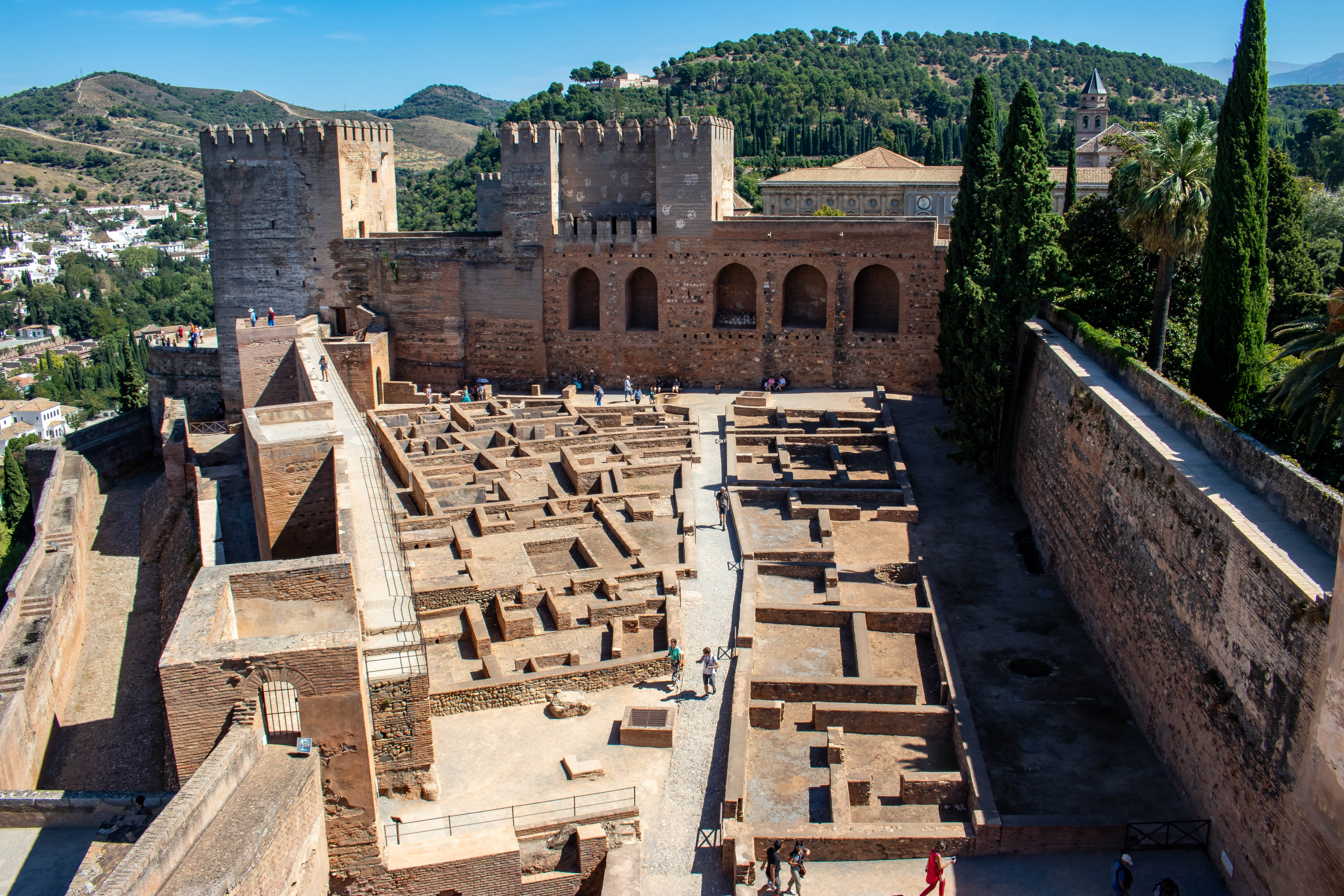
View from the Torre de la Vela, looking east across the Alcazaba's interior. The Torre del Homenaje is on the left, at the back, and the Torre Quebrada is to the right of it.

The Alcazaba has a roughly triangular layout, with the peaks of this triangle formed by the Torre de la Vela to the west, the Torre del Homenaje to the northeast, and the Torre Hueca to the southeast. (Note: The names of the gates and towers in this section come from their Spanish designations, unless otherwise indicated.) The empty space within the walls of this triangle is occupied by a residential area with urban amenities.

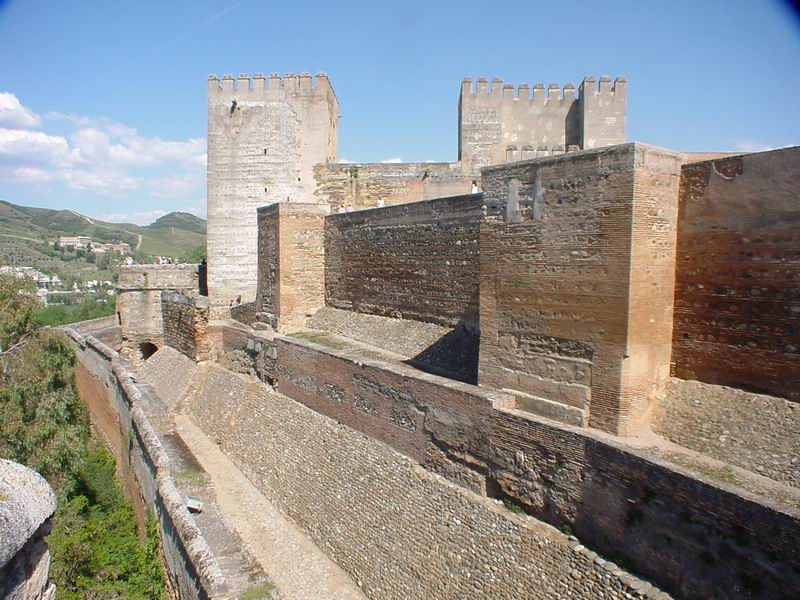
View of the walls and ramparts on the north side of the fortress

The fortress is protected by multiple layers of walls. This is especially evident on the northern side, where it is defended by up to three lines of walls corresponding to different elements of the Alhambra's defensive system. The inner wall is tall and punctuated by three small rectangular towers or bastions, with Zirid foundations. It connects to the Torre del Homenaje at one end and the Torre de la Vela at the other end. The second wall, below the inner wall, corresponds to an outer enclosing wall that surrounds the entire Alcazaba known as the adarve ('rampart'). The third and outermost wall is part of the longer perimeter wall that encloses the entire Alhambra. In this area it also protects the road that runs between the city and the Alhambra's interior, passing through the gate known as Puerta de las Armas ('Gate of Arms'). Within the area of this outer rampart, near the Puerta de las Armas, is a ruined structure that formerly housed the stables. The main southern and eastern walls of the Alcazaba, which form the other two sides of the "triangle", also stand behind an outer enclosing wall.

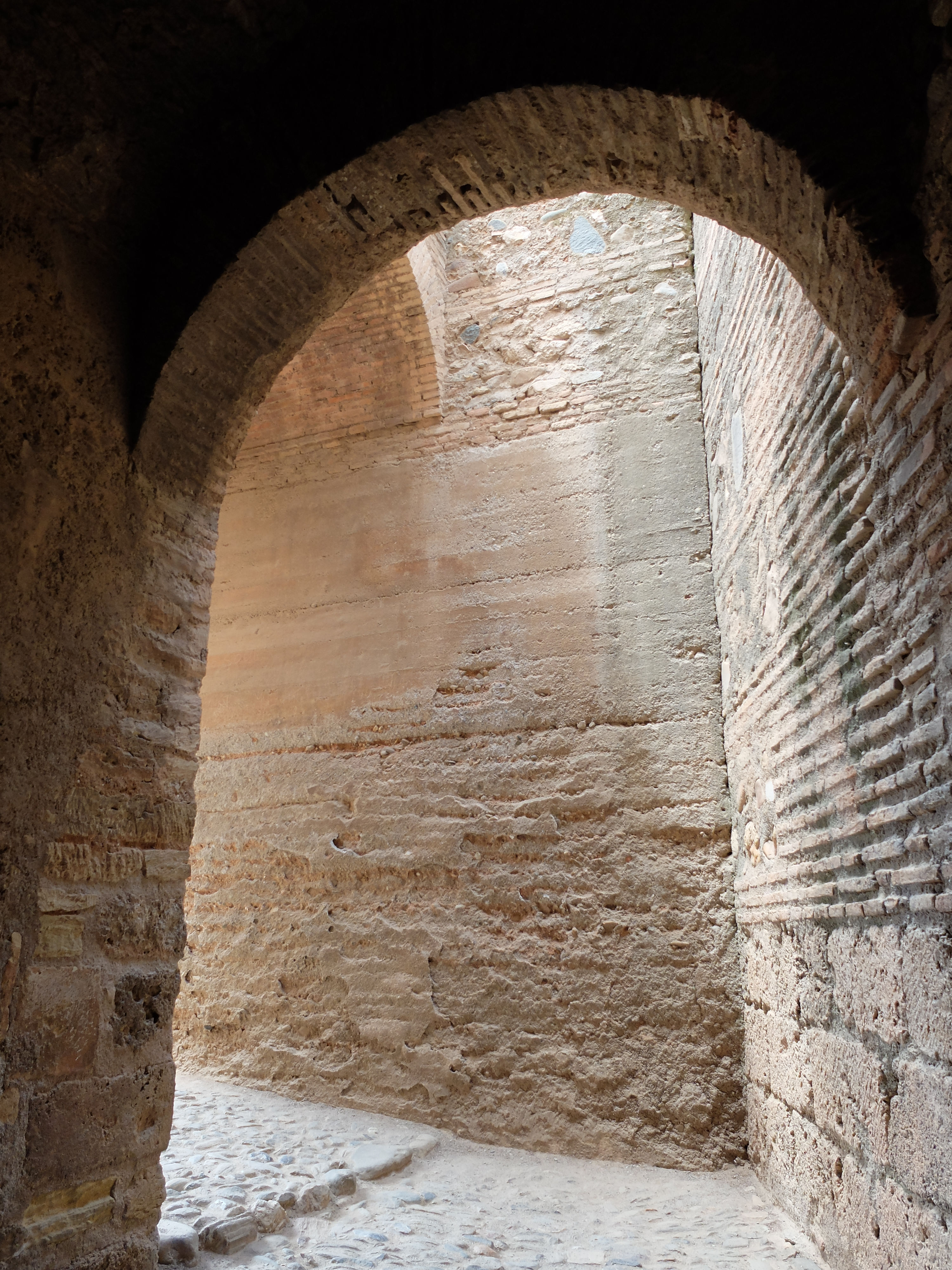
The entrance gate to the inner fortress, next to the Torre del Homenaje

The entrance to the Alcazaba compound is on its east side, facing the rest of the Alhambra. The entrance to the inner fortress, however, was hidden at the base of the Torre del Homenaje. Its obscured setting made it more difficult for any spies or observers to monitor movements within the fortress such as the changing of the guard. It was reached by a winding ramp which turned multiple times, slowing down any potential attackers. The gate itself has a bent passage, part of which is unroofed so as to allow defenders to throw projectiles from above onto any attackers entering the gate.

The walls themselves are built mostly out of rammed earth, like the rest of the Alhambra. A lime-based concrete was used as a binding agent, especially around the base of walls that carried a heavy load. Brick was used for interior areas and decorative elements. Stone was used for the gate leading into the inner fortress. At the outer base of the defensive walls there is usually a sloped wall reinforcement called an alambor ('escarp'), which made attacking the walls more difficult.

=== Torre del Homenaje and eastern towers ===
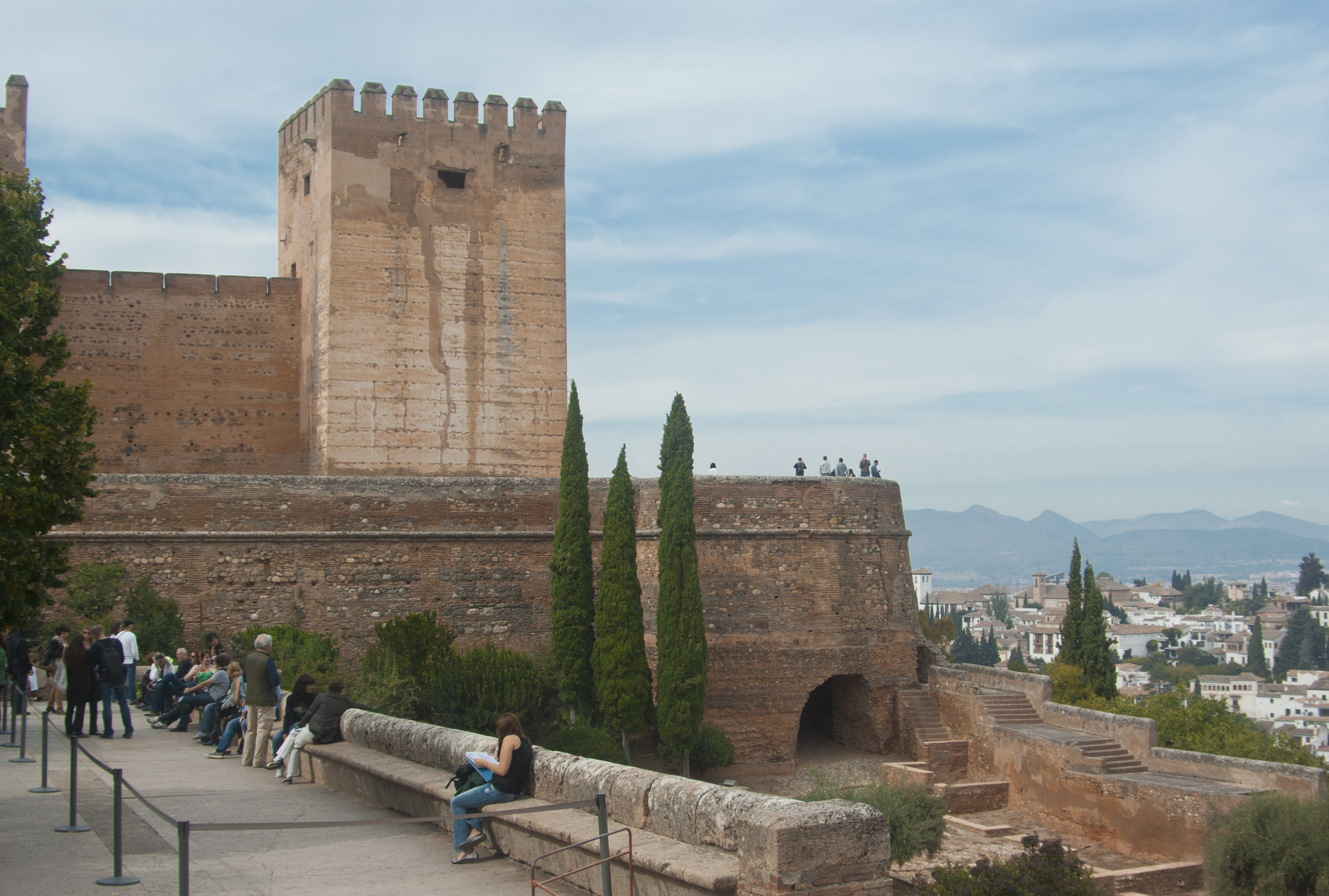
The Torre del Homenaje, seen from the east. Below it, to the right, is the Torre del Cubo, a bastion reinforced in the 16th century to better resist gunpowder artillery attacks

The Torre del Homenaje ('Tower of Homage') is the tallest tower in the Alcazaba, with its terrace being the highest point in the fortress. Located at the northeastern corner of the fortress, the tower is 26 m (85 ft) tall and its base measures 12.12 by 10.46 m (40 by 34 ft). Because of its commanding position, it served as the keep and military command post of the complex, from which the Nasrid commanders coordinated the Alhambra's defenses if attacked. From the terrace, visual signals could be sent to other watch towers around the area, possibly with the help of mirrors or smoke signals. The tower has five floors which are covered by a variety of vaulted ceilings. One of these levels contained the residence of the commander of the Alhambra's guards. The residence was organized similarly to the courtyard houses that were typical of the time and which are also found in the urban area of the fortress. The first Nasrid emir, Muhammad I, may have lived inside this tower after his foundation of the Alhambra.

The Torre del Homenaje forms the northern end of the eastern wall of the fortress. Two other towers are part of this wall. At the middle is the Torre Quebrada ('Broken Tower'), a tall and wide rectangular tower. At the south end of the wall is the smaller Torre Hueca ('Hollow Tower'), also known as the Torre del Adarguero ('Tower of the Shieldmaker'). Another tower, the Torre del Cubo ('Cube Tower' or 'Turret Tower'), also stands at the northern base of the Tower del Homenaje. This tower, which has a rounded profile on its outer side, was added in the Christian Spanish period as part of other improvements to provide better protection against the gunpowder artillery of the time. It was built around an existing square tower from the Nasrid period known as the Torre de la Tahona, which formed part of a gate known as Puerta de la Tahona ('Gate of the Flourmill'), which is no longer extant.

=== Torre de la Vela and the western bastion ===
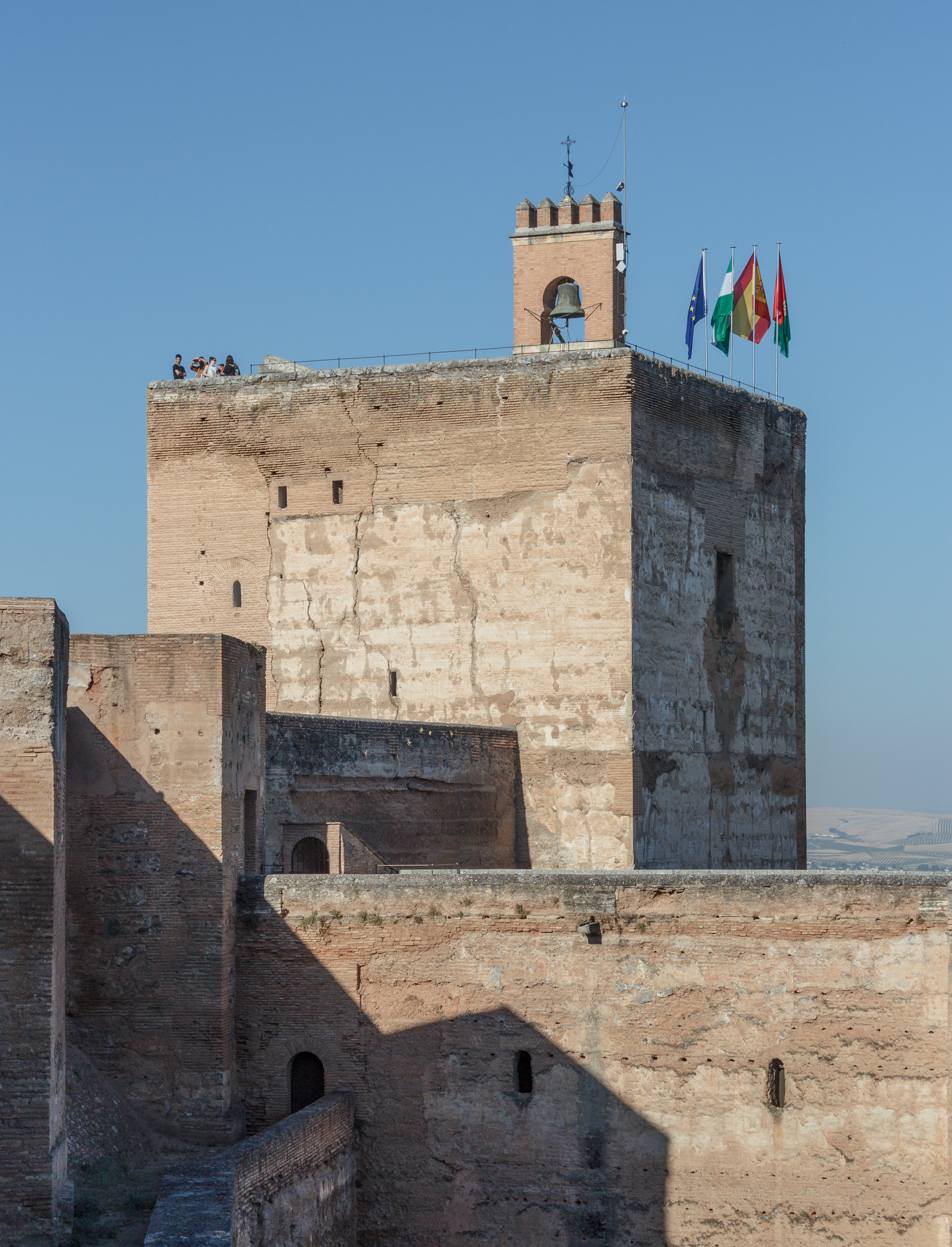
Torre de la Vela, seen from the east

The western tip of the Alcazaba is dominated by a massive square bastion tower known as the Torre de la Vela ('Watch Tower' or 'Sentinel Tower'), also formerly known as the Torre del Sol ('Tower of the Sun'). This tower is visible from most of the city and its large terrace allows for commanding views of the area. Inside the tower are four levels of chambers. The chambers feature a central vaulted space surrounded by galleries with brick pillars and more vaulted ceilings. As was typical in other large Nasrid towers (but especially evident here), the chamber of each floor is larger than the one below it, so that the outer walls of the tower become progressively thinner towards the top. This made the upper parts of the tower lighter and gave the tower more structural stability. The original Nasrid-period stairway has not survived and was probably in a different location than the one currently used to climb the tower today.

Since the Christian conquest the tower is surmounted by a bell which could be rung to sound the alarm. The bell also rang at regular times during the day and night, which helped the city's residents regulate their days, and also rang to mark special days, such as the "Day of Conquest" which commemorates the surrender of the city to Catholic Spain on January 2, 1492. Because of this bell, the tower is also known as the Torre de la Campana ('Bell Tower'). The bell was formerly located at the northeastern corner of the terrace but was moved to its current central and western location in 1840. Due to its regular use, the bell also had to be replaced in 1569, 1598, 1624, 1640, 1655, and for the last time in 1755, when the current bell was installed. The belfry was also destroyed by lightning and reconstructed in 1882. The bell became a symbol of Granada and was integrated into the city's coat of arms in 1843.

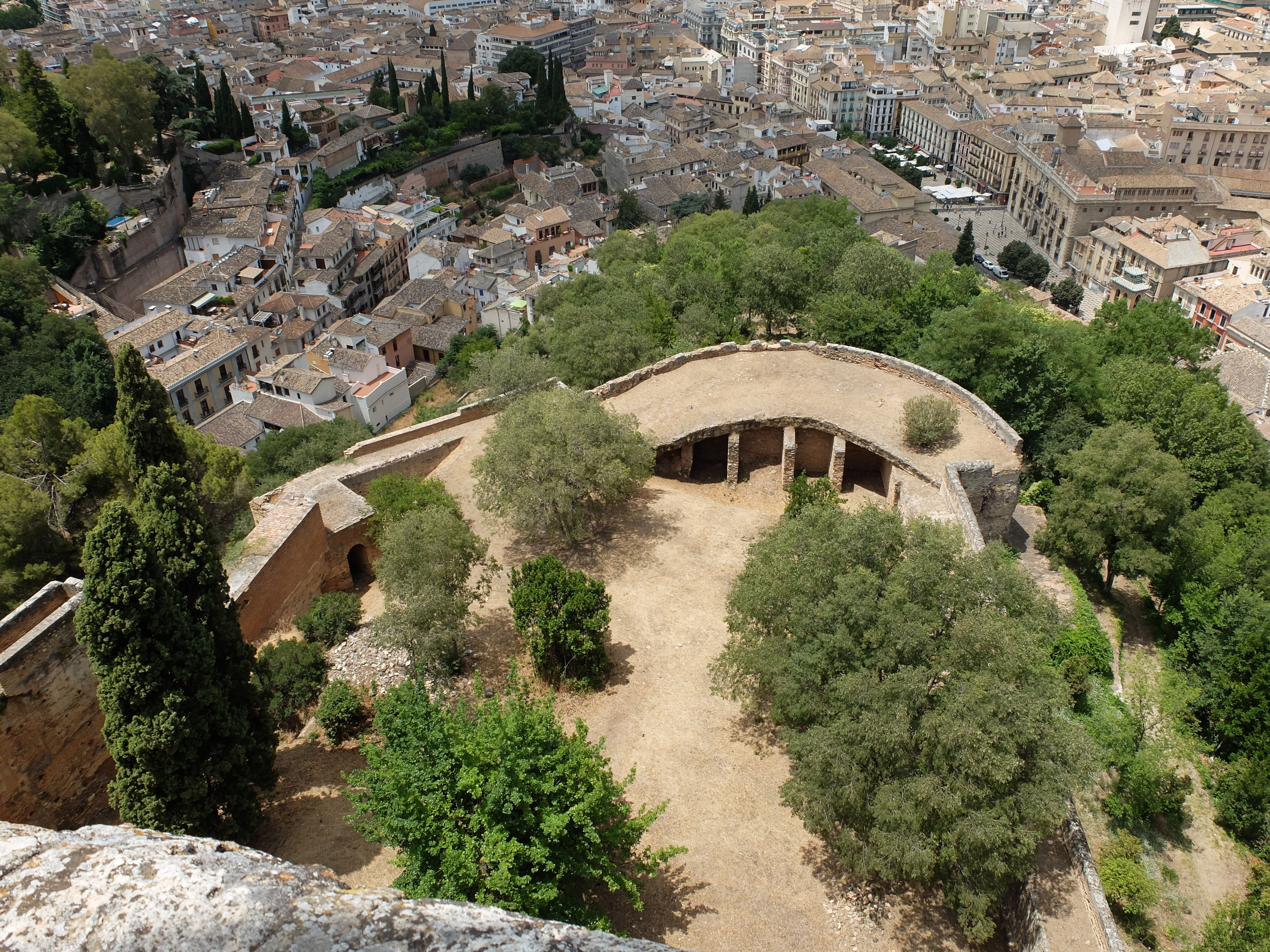
The Ravelin (western bastion below the Torre de la Vela)

At the western base of the tower is a wide bastion that extends towards the city, known as the Ravelin or Revellín. It existed since at least the 15th century but its history is not clearly established. Traces of other former structures also exist around it, including a lost connection to the city and a former entrance gate to the Alcazaba. Traces of the gate are visible in a horseshoe arch and a brick vault that has been obscured by later enlargements of the wall. The Ravelin is connected by another wall to the Torres Bermejas, an outlying fortification on the Mauror Hill to the south of the Alhambra. Between the Ravelin and the base of the Torre de la Vela is the outer wall or rampart that wraps around the base of the Alcazaba's inner walls. The walkway inside this rampart connects to both the Puerta de las Armas and the entrance to the inner fortress.

=== Interior urban area ===
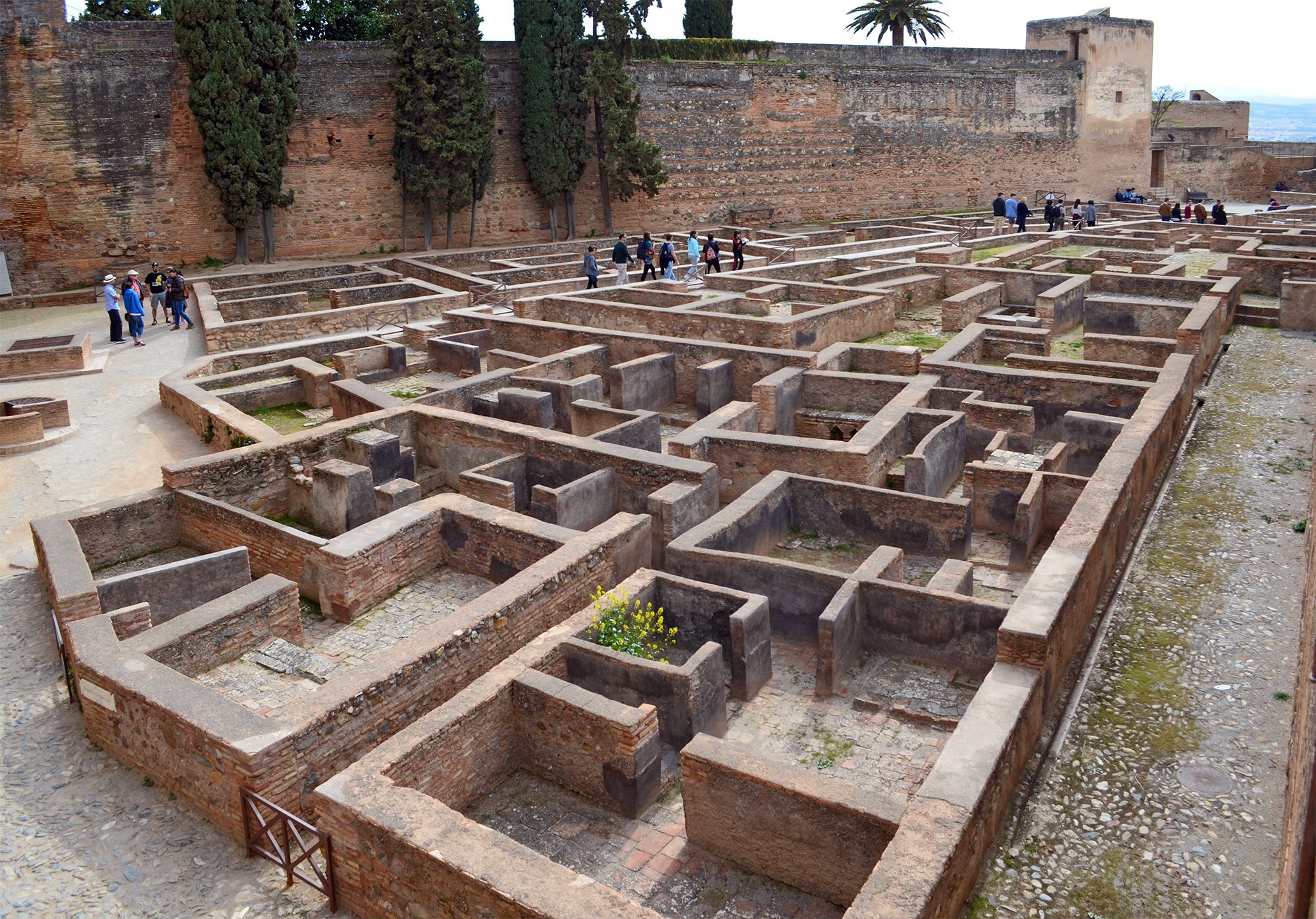
View of the urban district inside the inner fortress. In the foreground are the remains of the houses on the northern side.

The area within the walls of the inner fortress was occupied in the Nasrid era by a small residential district, known in Spanish as the Barrio Castrense ('Military Quarter'). The former structures here no longer stand but their foundations have been excavated and are visible today. A long, narrow street runs down the middle of this area, from east to west, and divides it into two zones. On the north side of the street is an array of about ten to seventeen houses with similar layouts but varying sizes. They conform to typical Andalusi house architecture of the period. They have bent entrances that protect the privacy of the interior. Each house is centered around an interior patio or courtyard with a water element like a fountain or pool, with various rooms arranged around it. Each house had a latrine which was flushed with the help of water from a cistern. These houses were inhabited by the elite guards of the Alhambra, along with their families.

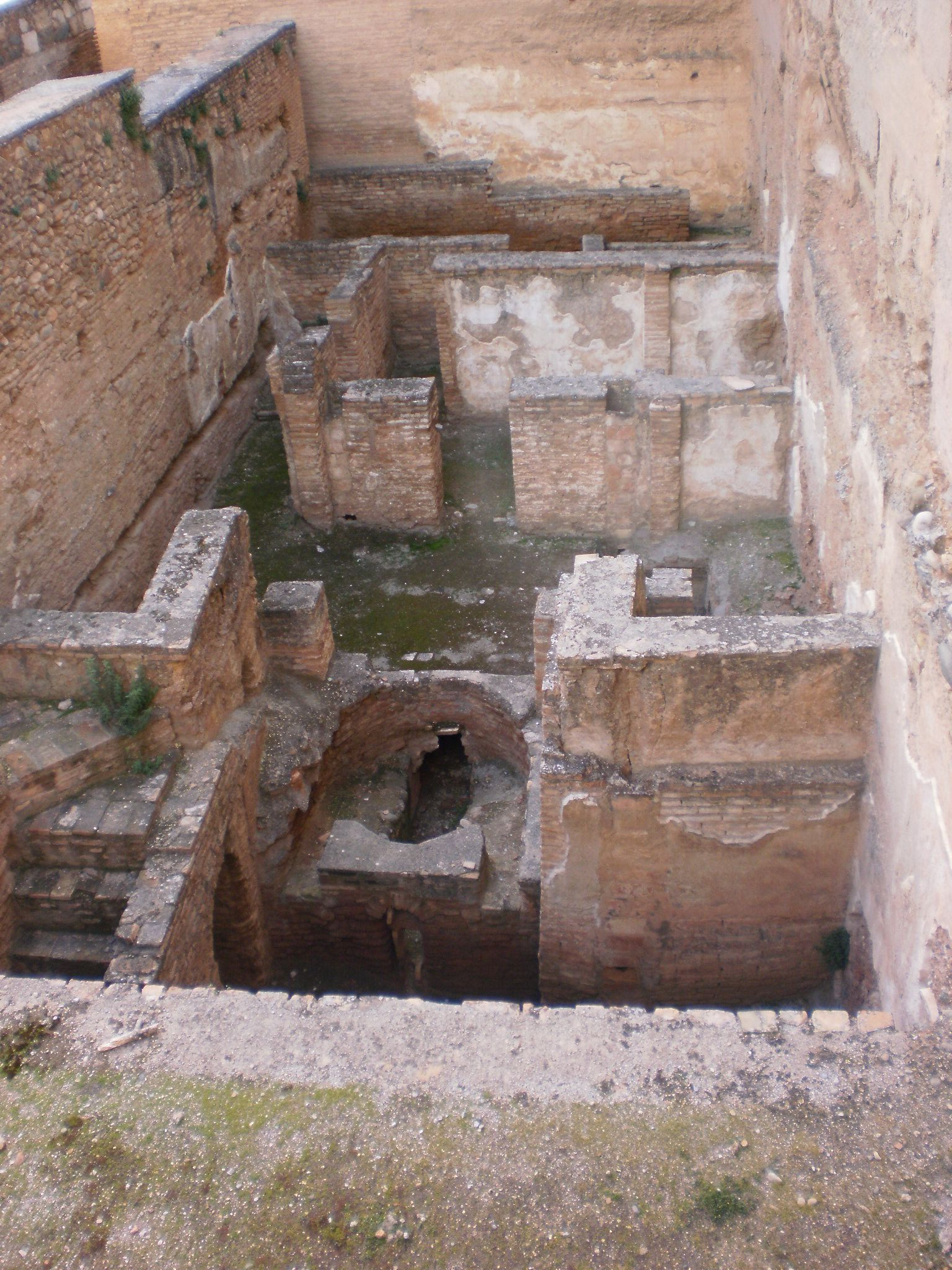
Remains of the hammam (baths) at the west end of the enclosure

On the south side of the main street is another array of structures similar to the houses on the north side but with a more regular plan. These were probably either storehouses or the residences for younger troops and guards. To the west of end of the urban area where several important amenities: a hammam (bathhouse), a large cistern to provide water for the district, and a communal kitchen to provide food and rations. The cistern was rebuilt in the 16th century. Also located at various points inside this military enclosure were several subterranean chambers, known as mazmorras, that served as dungeons and silos. The dungeons became notorious to the Spanish Christians during the Nasrid period as many Christian prisoners of war, especially important ones, were kept here in the most secure part of the Alhambra. Prisoners were typically forced to perform manual labour during the day and then lowered back into the dungeons at night. The chambers are dome or bell-shaped, with an opening at the top where prisoners were lowered into them. At the bottom, the chambers were divided into sleeping areas by brick walls which radiated outward from the center of the room.

=== The southern ramparts and the Jardín de los Adarves ===
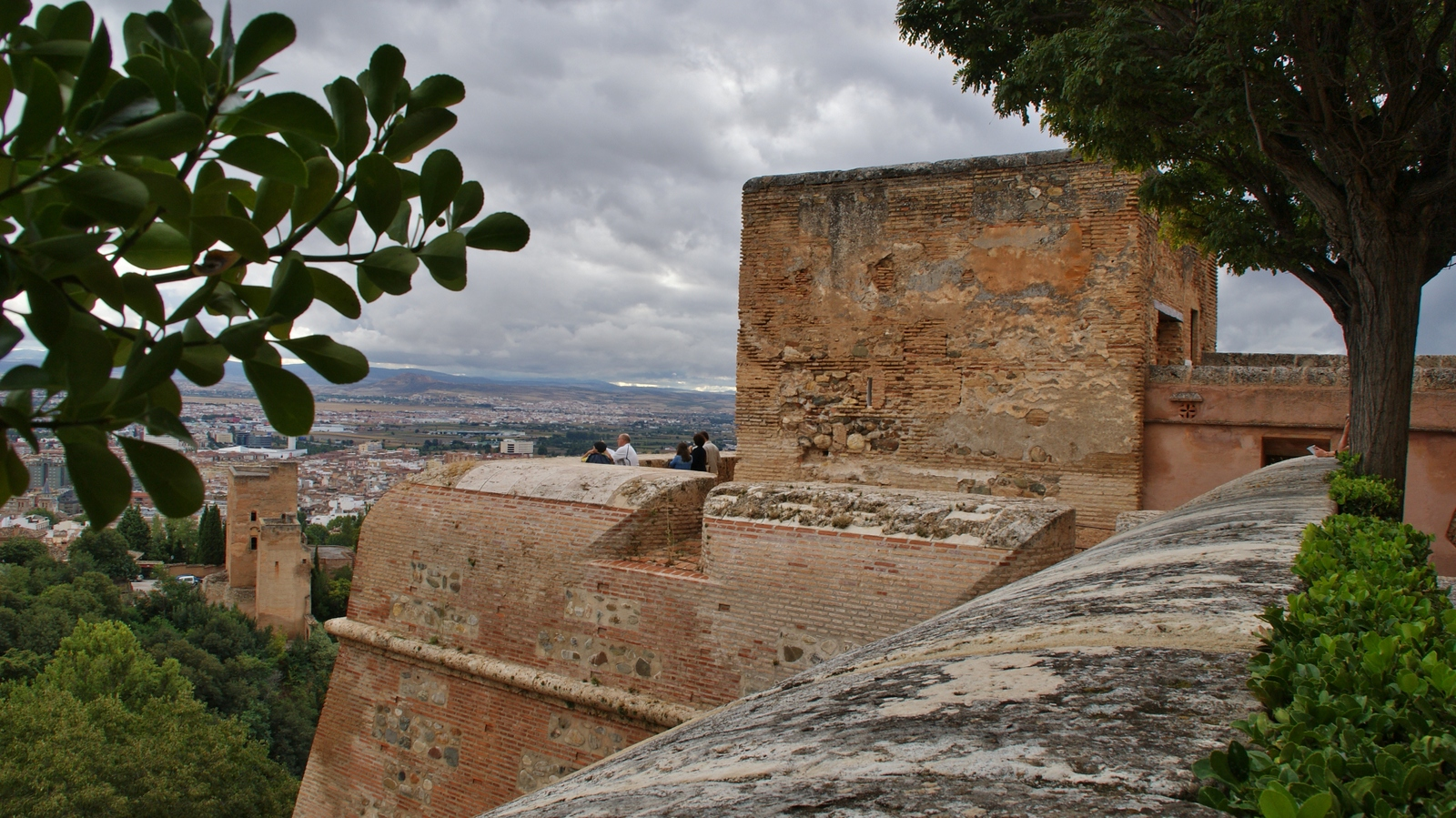
The Torre de la Polvóra

The Torre de la Polvóra ('Gunpowder Tower') is a small tower that stands at southern base of the Torre de la Vela. The southern ramparts of the Alcazaba became strategically more important in the 15th century as gunpowder artillery became a regular part of siege warfare. In the 16th century the tower was reinforced with a thicker bastion to better withstand any artillery attacks and to allow the placement of a cannon battery. The tower was strategically important in monitoring the nearby walls and fortifications and protecting the flank of the larger Torre de la Vela. Originally, it was also a sally port which allowed troops to exit and defend the other ramparts in this area, but this exit has since been buried under the rampart of the Jardín de los Adarves to the east.

The Jardín de los Adarves ('Garden of the Ramparts') is a recreational garden located on top of the outer southern rampart running along the base of the inner fortress wall. As part of the improvements to the fortress to update its defenses against modern artillery, the moat or ditch between the outer rampart and the inner wall was filled in during the 16th century and reinforced by a new sophisticated rampart of brick topped by curved battlements, giving the fortification its current form. Historical documents suggest this construction likely took place between 1550 and 1555. After completion, light artillery could be stationed on the platform along this rampart. After the 16th century there were few military threats to Granada and the Alcazaba lost its strategic importance. The exact date of the rampart platform's conversion to a garden is not known, but probably took place around 1628, when the first of the two wall fountains in the garden was built. This first fountain, at the garden's eastern end, is carved with images of genies riding dolphins. At the middle of the garden there is also a standing fountain carved with arabesque-looking motifs. This was an extension that was added in 1624 to the fountain in the Nasrid-built Court of the Lions. When the Lions' Fountain was restored to its presumed original state in 1954, this extension was removed and moved here.

Jardín de los Adarves (Garden of the Ramparts)

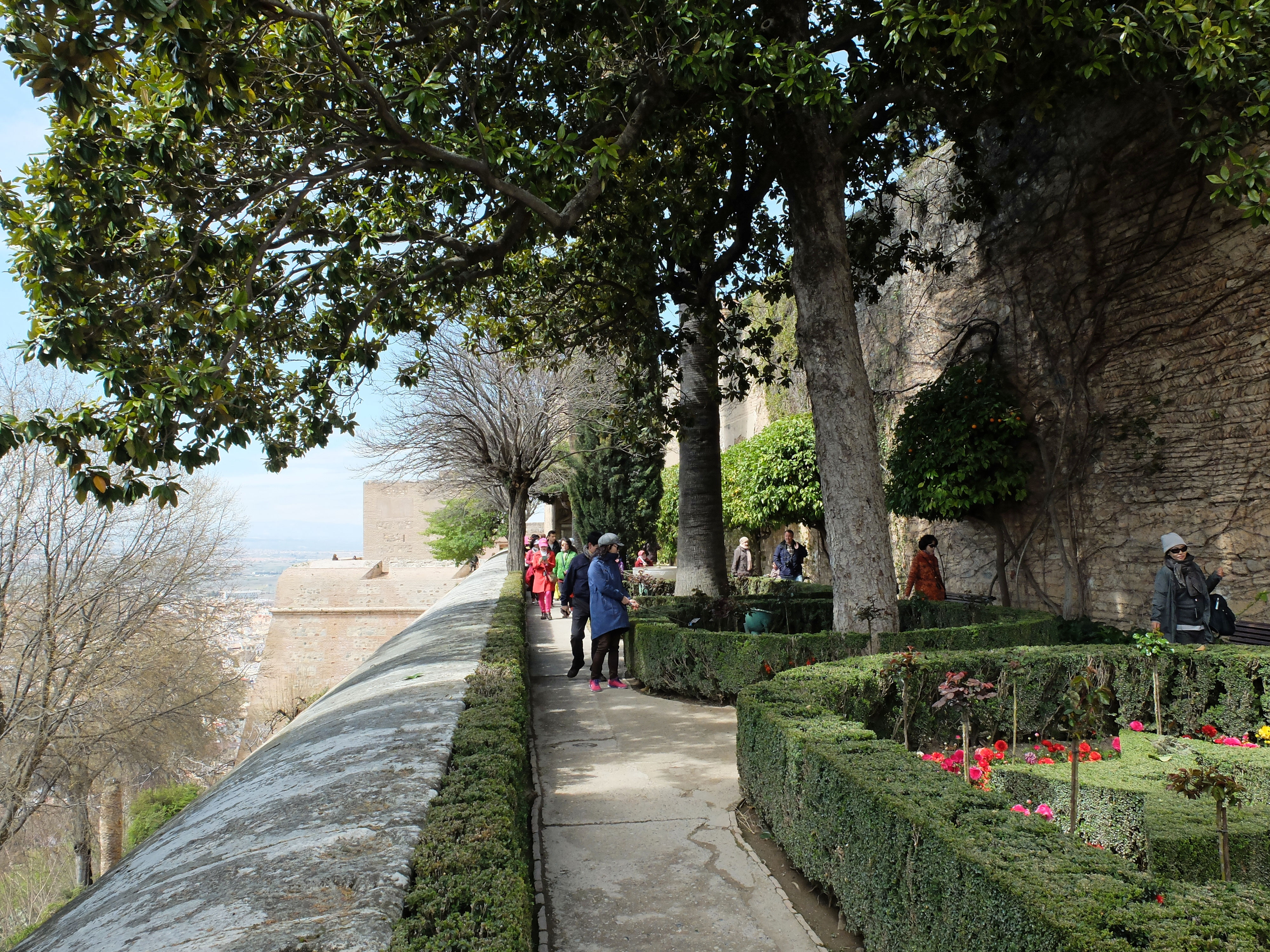
Jardín de los Adarves, along the southern rampart of the Alcazaba

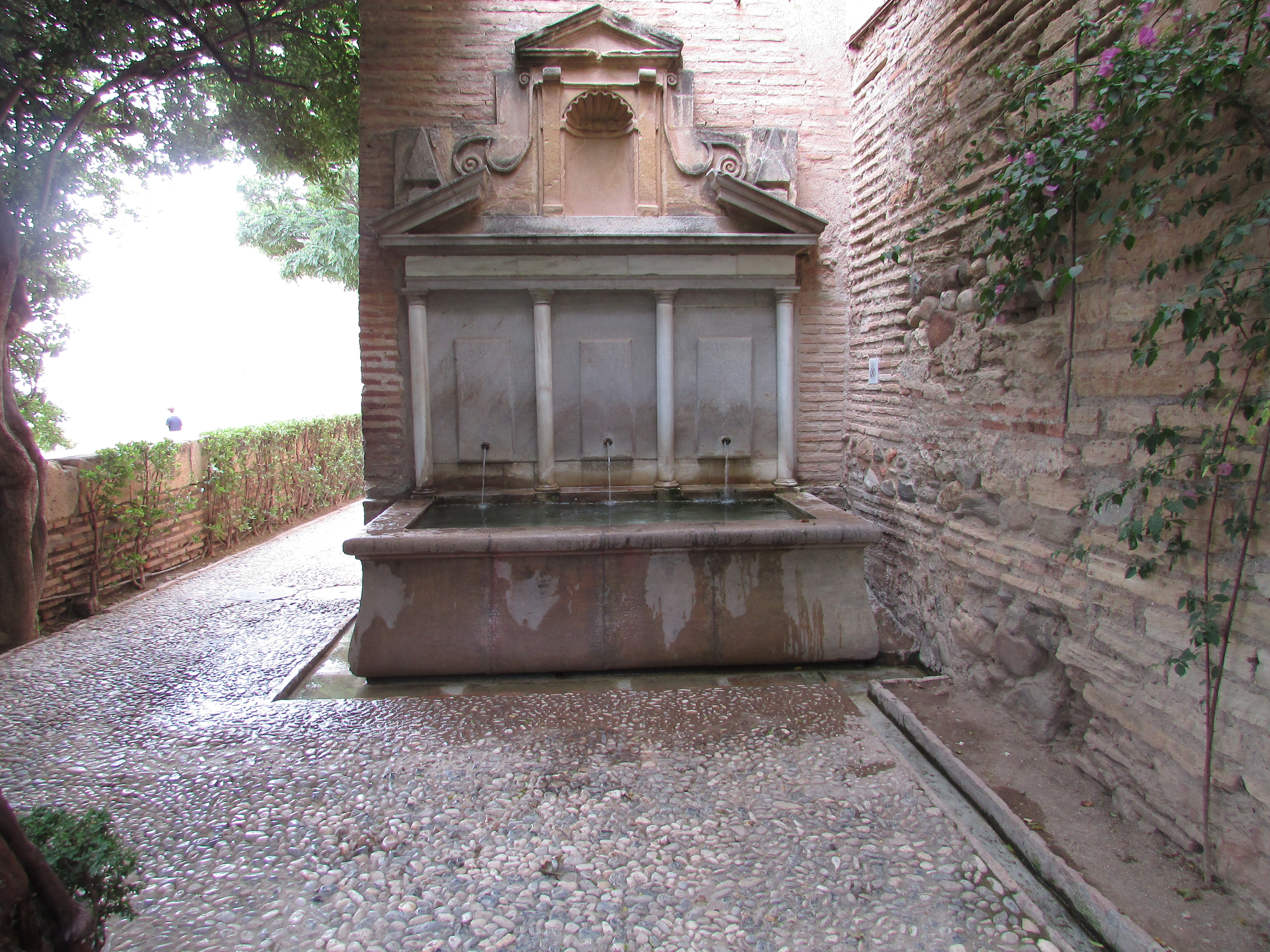
Fountain at the western end of the garden

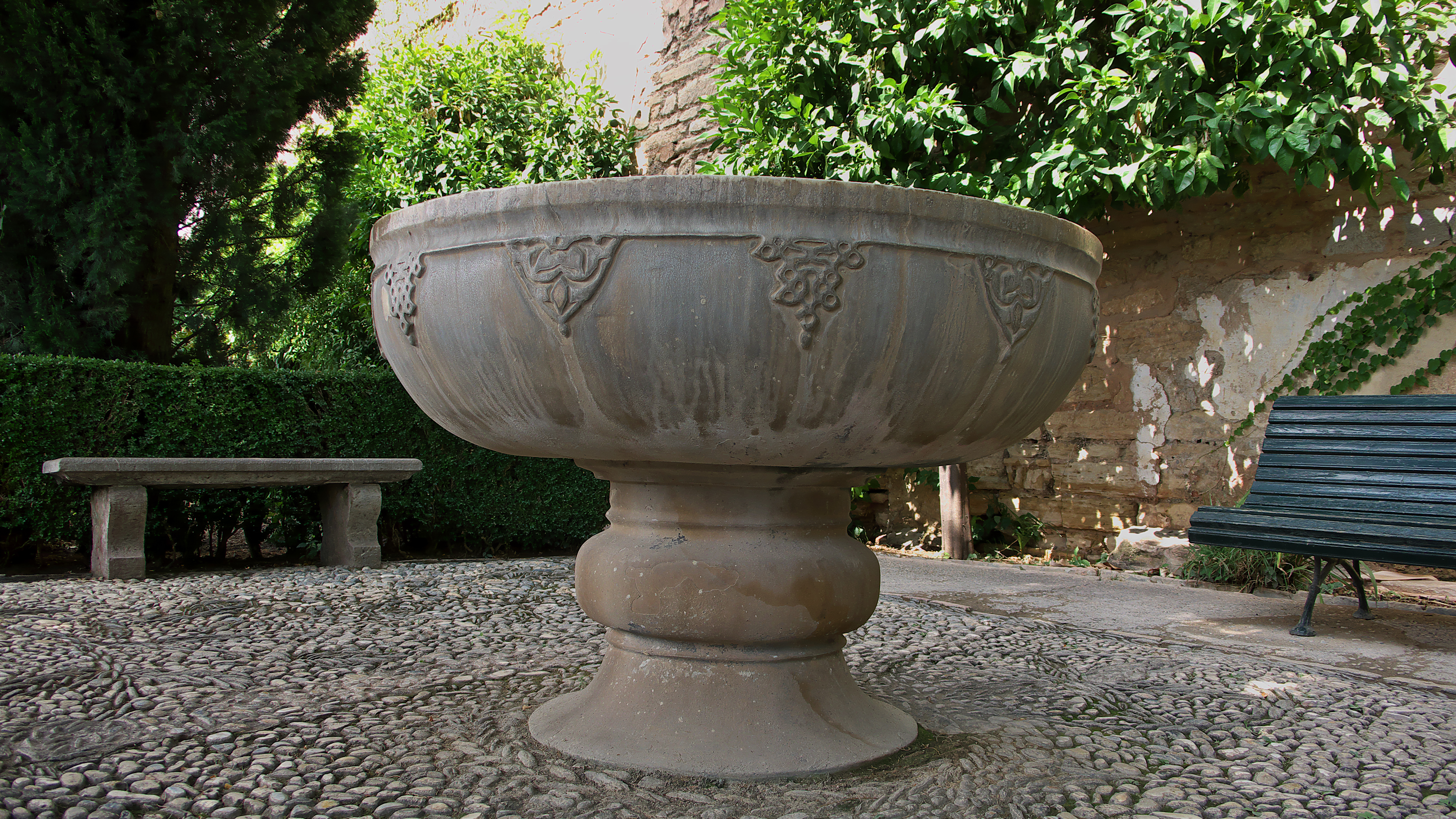
Fountain piece in the garden that was installed in the Court of the Lions in 1624, moved here in 1954

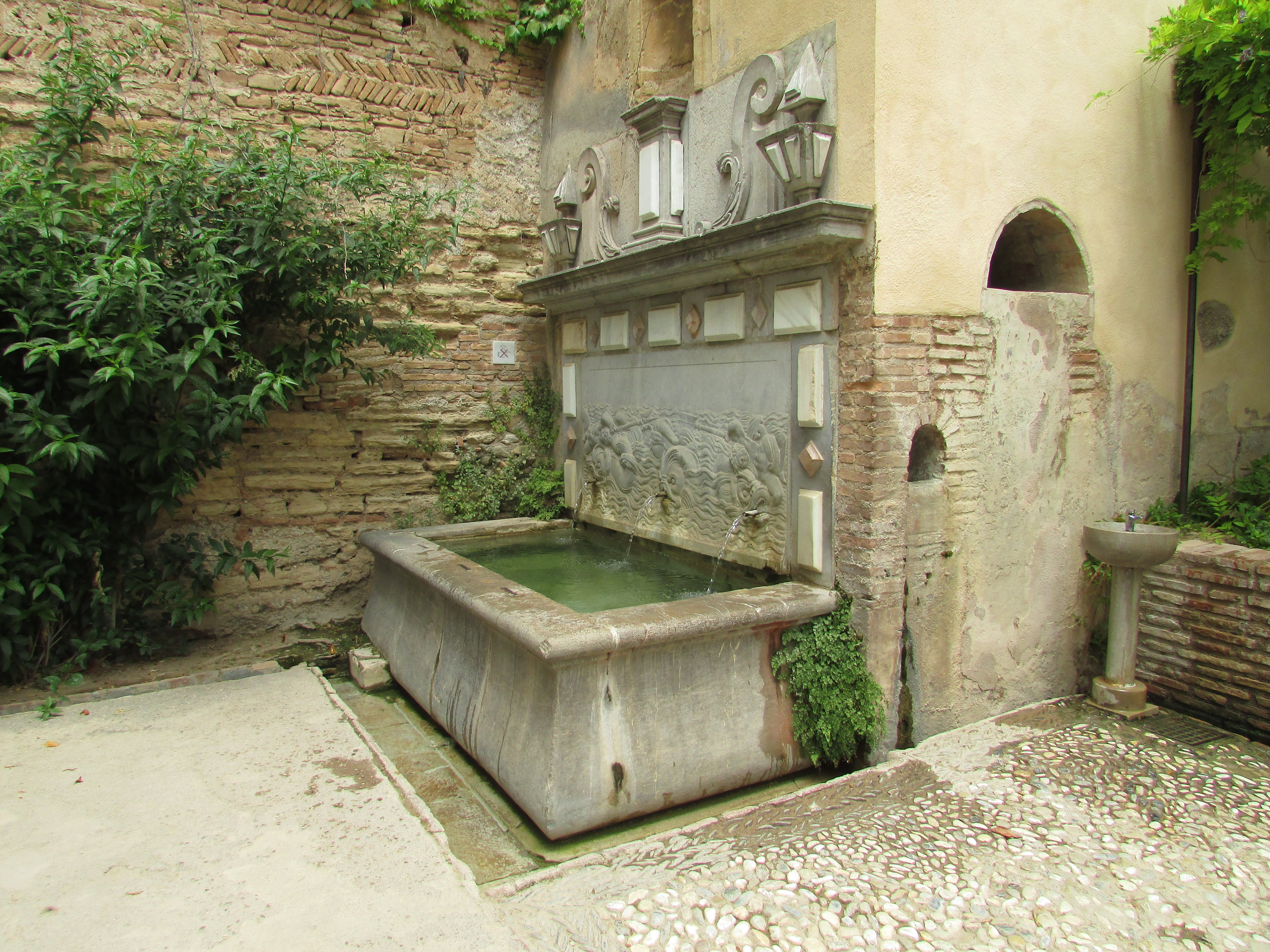
Fountain at the east end of the garden, with aquatic imagery

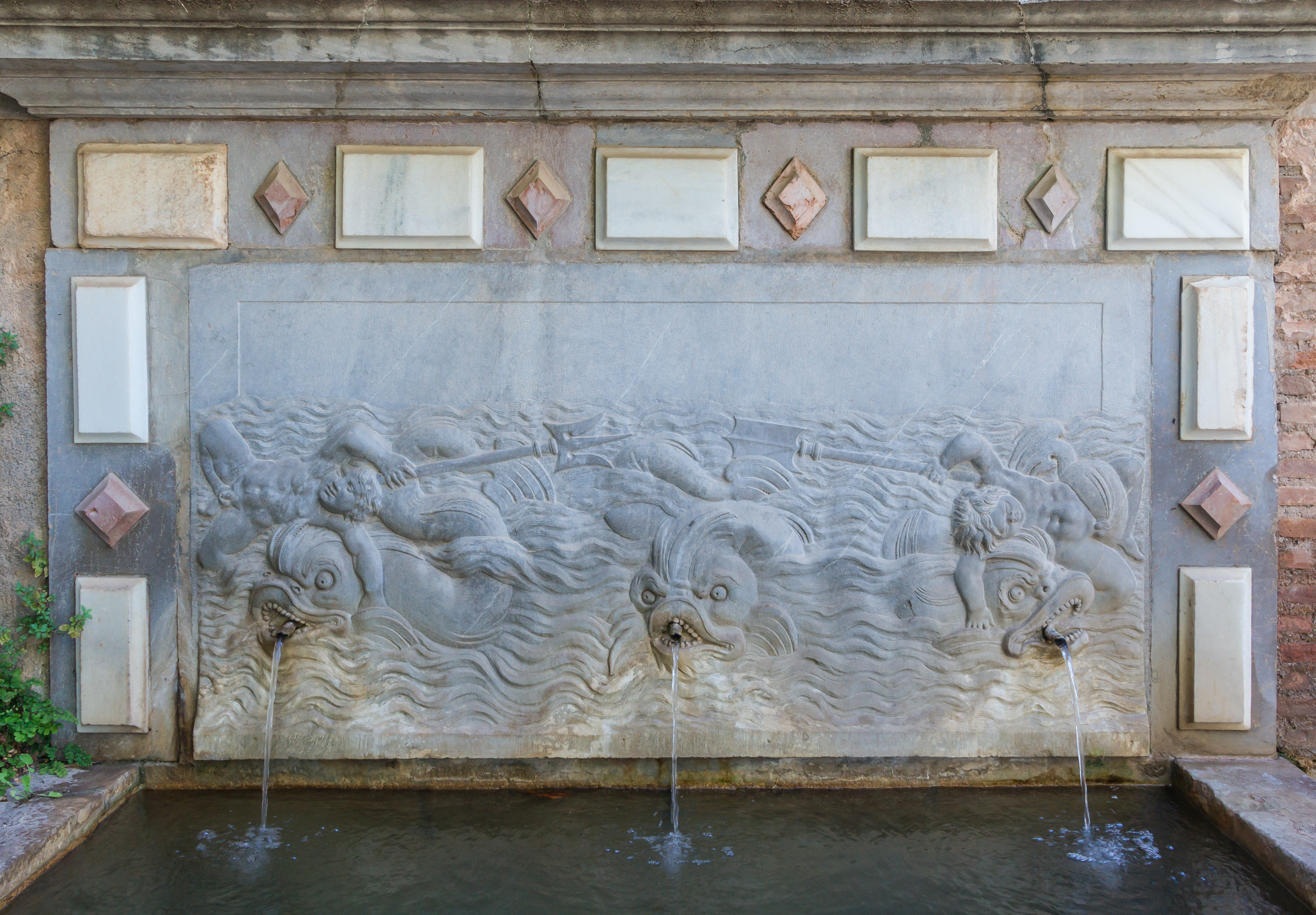
Detail of the eastern fountain
