= Kasbah =

Type of fortress in Arab or Islamic regions

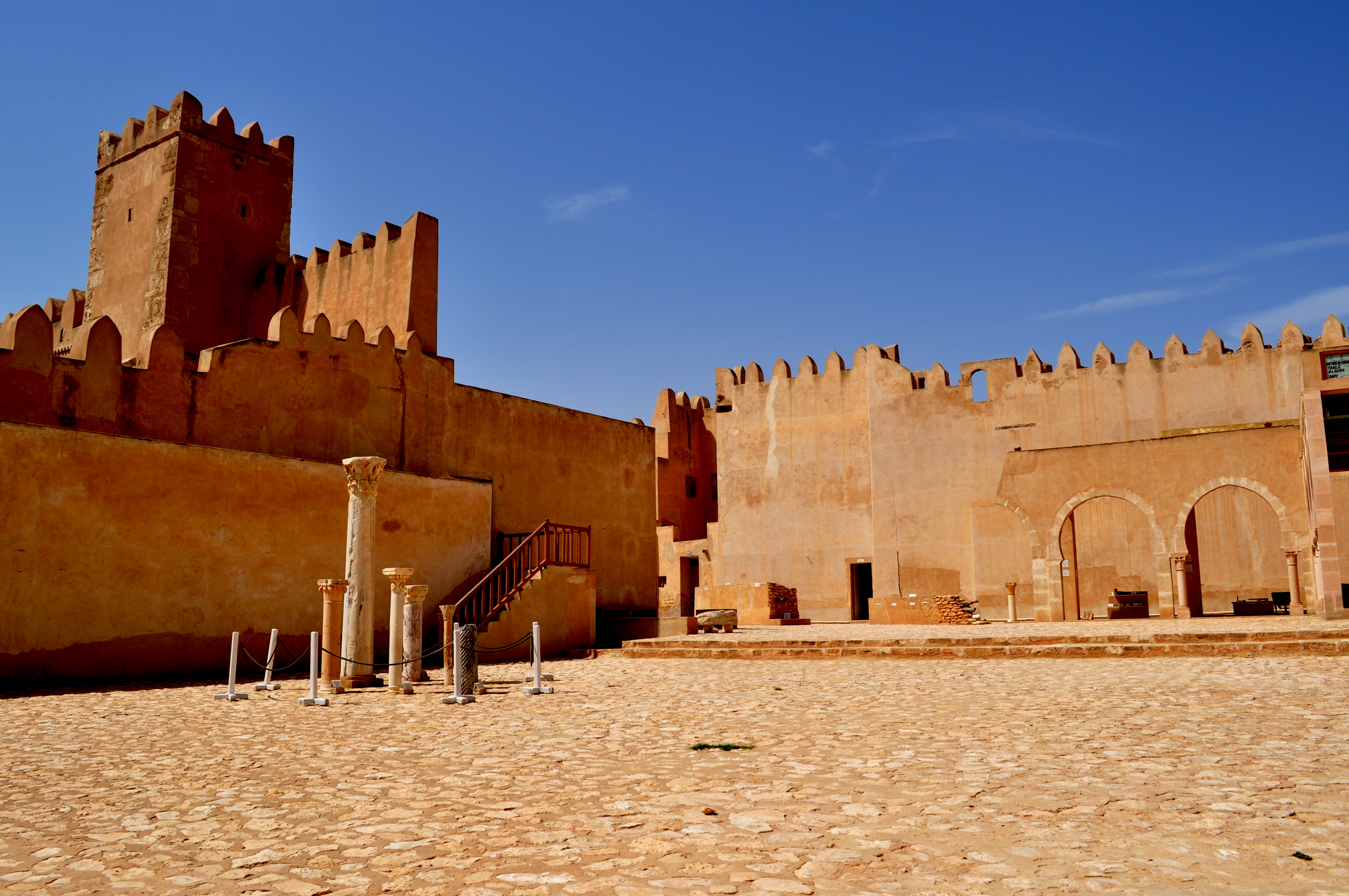
Kasbah of Sfax in Tunisia

A kasbah (/ˈkæzbɑː/, also US: /ˈkɑːz-/; Arabic: قصبة, romanized: qaṣaba, lit. 'fortress', Arabic pronunciation: [qasˤaba], Maghrebi Arabic: [qasˤba]), also spelled qasbah, qasba, qasaba, or casbah, is a fortress, most commonly a North African citadel or fortified quarter of a city. Spanish has the equivalent term alcazaba (Spanish: [alkaˈθaβa]), derived from the same Arabic word. By extension, the term can also refer to a medina quarter, particularly in Algeria. In various languages, the Arabic word, or local words borrowed from the Arabic word, can also refer to a settlement, a fort, a watchtower, or a blockhouse.

== Citadel or fortress ==
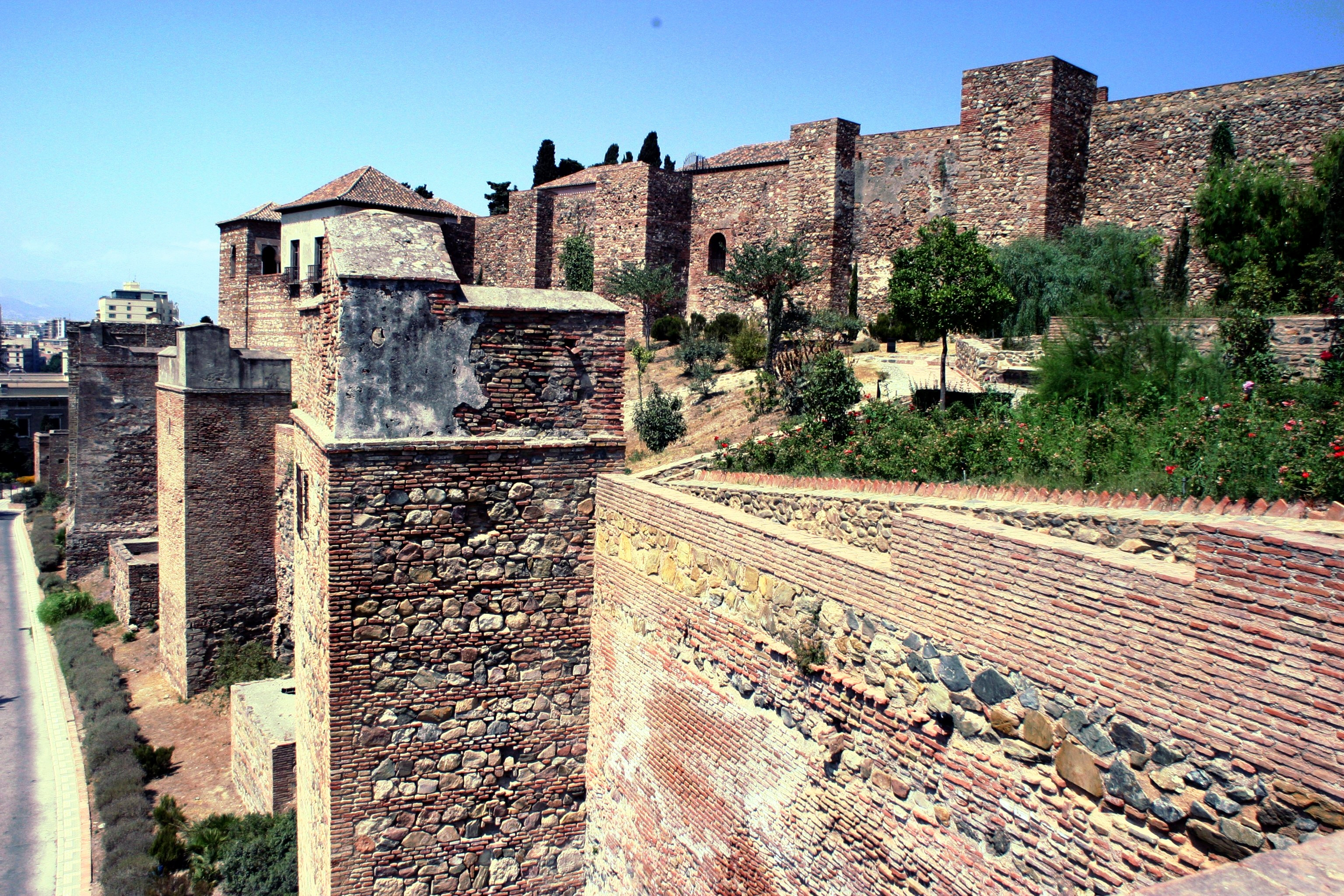
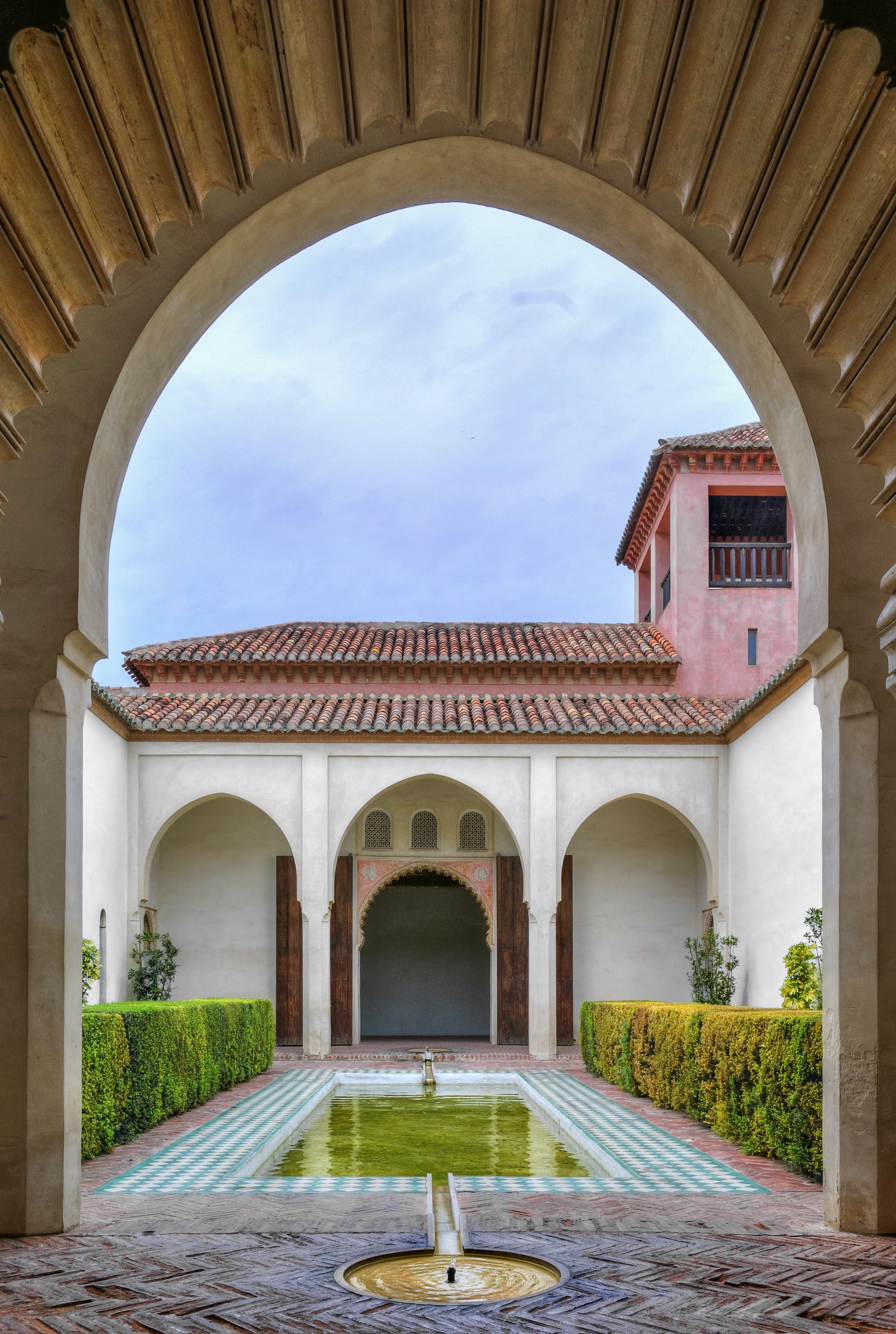
Alcazaba of Málaga: exterior walls (left) and interior palace courtyard (right)

The term qasaba was historically flexible but it essentially denotes a fortress, commonly a citadel that protects a city or settlement area, or that serves as the administrative center. A kasbah citadel typically housed the military garrison and other privileged buildings such as a palace, along with other amenities such as a mosque and a hammam (bathhouse). Some kasbahs are built in a strategic elevated position overlooking the city, like the Kasbah of the Oudayas in Rabat, Morocco, or the Alcazaba of Málaga in Spain. It could also be a large purpose-built royal quarter, protected by its own set of walls, that housed the palace of the ruler and the administration of the state. Examples of this include the Kasbah of Marrakesh and the Kasbah of Tunis, both founded by the Almohads, who built or redeveloped similar palace enclosures in many important cities of their empire. In some cases, kasbahs could be simple fortified enclosures around a city that housed military garrisons, without being the main citadel. In Fez, for example, there were up to 13 kasbahs built throughout the city in different periods, including the Kasbah an-Nouar and the Kasbah Cherarda.

According to architect and restorer Leopoldo Torres Balbás, the Alcazaba of Málaga is the prototype of military architecture in the Taifa period in Al-Andalus, with its double wall and many fortifications. Its only parallel is the castle of Krak des Chevaliers in Syria. Examples of other alcazabas in Spain include the Alcazaba of Almería, the Alcazaba of Antequera, the Alcazaba of Badajoz, the Alcazaba of Guadix, the Alcazaba of Mérida, the Castle of Molina de Aragón, the Alcazaba of Alcalá la Real and in the Alcazaba of the Alhambra in Granada.

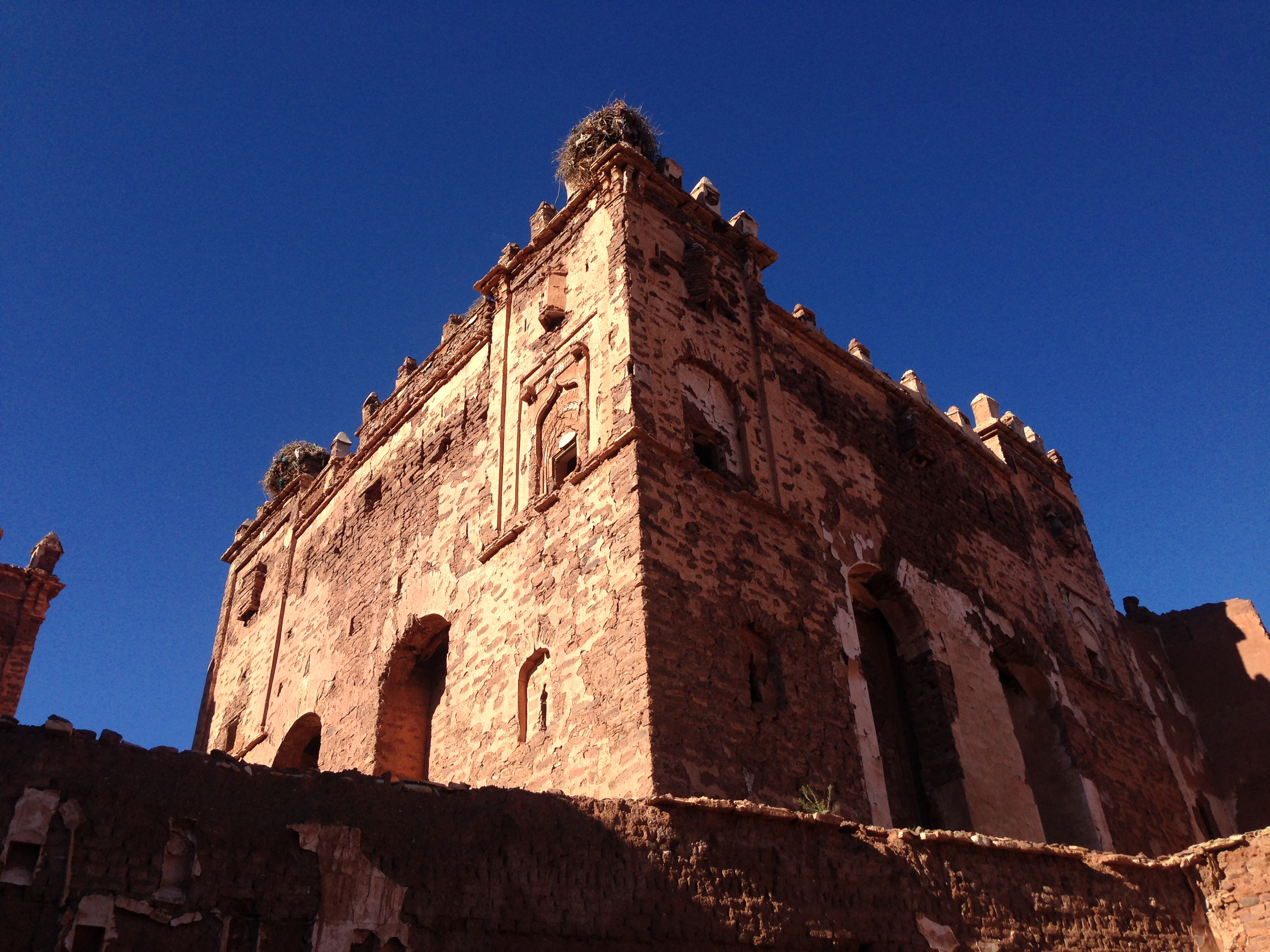
Telouet Kasbah in Morocco

In Morocco, the term "kasbah" is also used in predominantly Amazigh regions to denote a fortified residence (tighremt in Amazigh languages), often built of mudbrick, such as the Kasbah of Telouet or the Kasbah Amridil. In southern Tunisia, the term is sometimes applied to a type of fortified granaries (also known as ksour).

== Other uses of the term ==
=== Old city ===
The word kasbah may also be used to describe the old part of a city, in which case it has the same meaning as a medina quarter. In Algiers, the name qasaba originally referred to the upper part of the city, which contained the citadel and residence of the rulers. Following the French conquest of the country in 1830, most of the historic lower town of Algiers was demolished and remodeled along European lines. The only part of the old city that remained relatively untouched was the upper town, thus known as the "Casbah" of Algiers. The Casbah of Dellys is another example of the term being used for an old city.

=== Watchtowers in the Arabian Peninsula ===
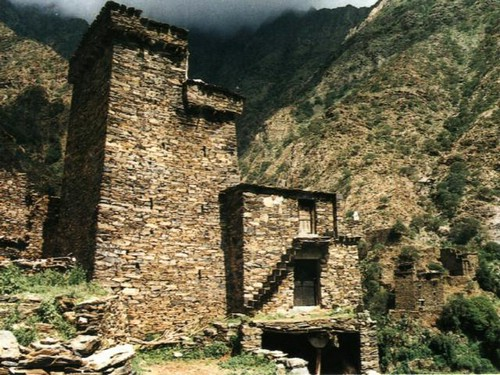
Kasbah watchtower in the Hejazi city of Al Baha, Saudi Arabia

The Encyclopædia Britannica article on Asir (southwestern province of Saudi Arabia), mentions that "ancient qasaba ("towers") found in the province were used as lookouts or granaries." Another book describes these towers as follows: "Apparently unique to Asir architecture are the qasaba towers. Controversy surrounds their function – some argue that they were built as lookouts, and others that they were keeps, or even granaries. Perhaps it is a combination, although the right position of a watchtower, on a hill top, is the wrong place for a keep or granary." Archaeologists have found images of similar towers in the ruins of Qaryat al-Fāw, in the Rub' al Khali of Saudi Arabia, that date from between the 3rd century BCE to the 4th century CE. "Homes rose two stories, supported by stone walls nearly two meters (6') thick and boasting such amenities as water-supply systems and second-floor latrines. One eye-catching mural faintly depicts a multi-story tower house with figures in the windows: Its design resembles similar dwellings today in Yemen and southern Saudi Arabia."

"Most of the qasabas have a circular plan, although some are square. Sometimes they have a band of quartz stones just below the windows or framing the windows – one well preserved example is at the top of Wadi Ain. The remains of a martello tower-like stone structure are just off the dirt track north of Al-Masnah. It appears to be an interesting antecedent of the Asir farmhouse and perhaps closely related to the qasaba. It is in ruins now, but was once a dwelling and is strongly defensive." One account says about a traditional village in Al-Bahah, Saudi Arabia: "Even the road that leads to the village is impressive, and several historical stone and slate towers dot the way. Al-Bahah Province is known as the region of 1001 towers, once built to protect villages, roads, and plantations from rival tribes. Today, these towers are abandoned, and many of them are partially or completely in ruins."

== See also ==
- Ribat
- "Rock the Casbah" – popular 1982 song by the Clash which features the word "Casbah"
