= Taznakht =

Taznakht ⵜⴰⵣⵏⴰⵅⵜ تازناخت
- Town in Morocco
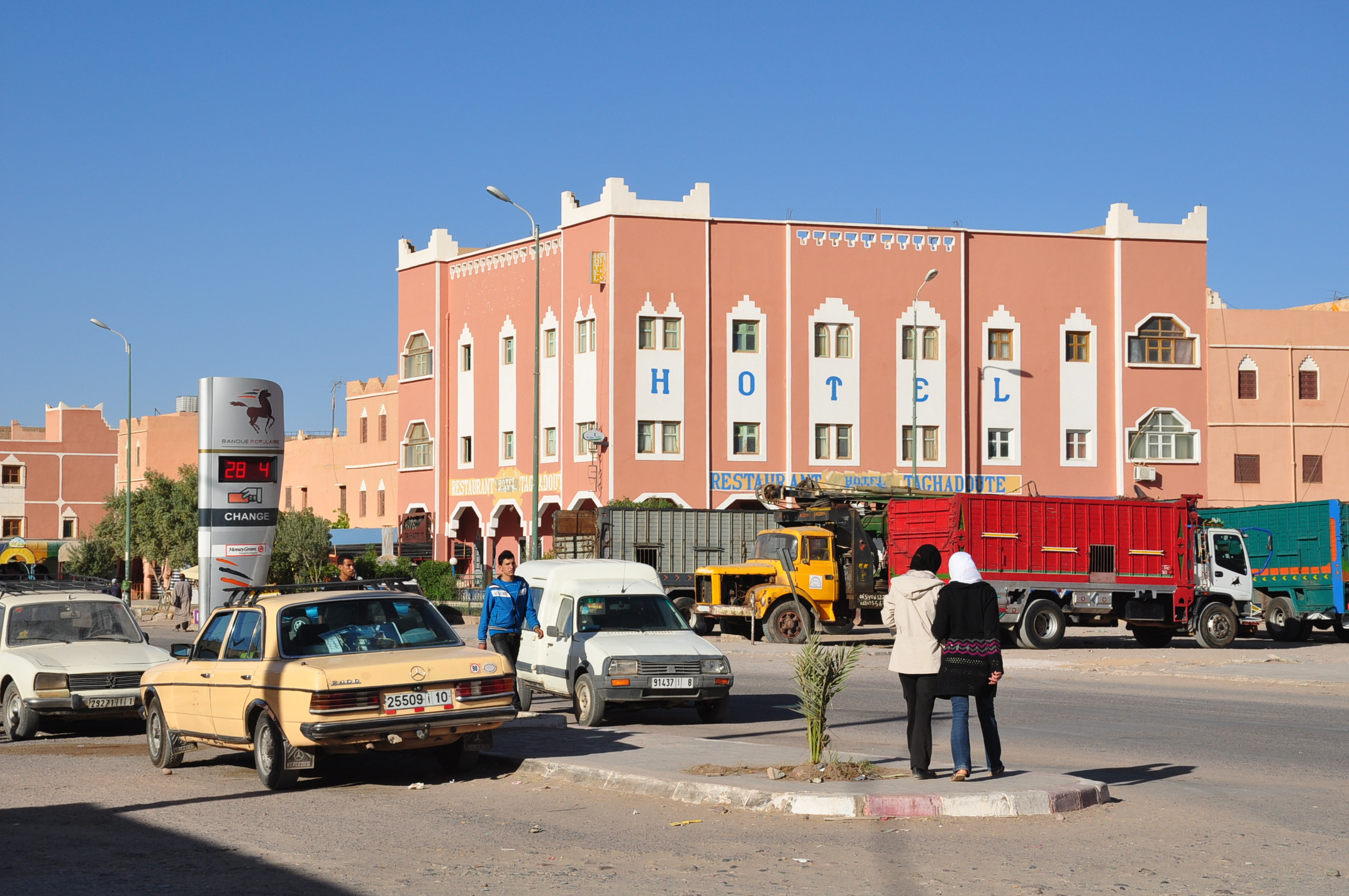
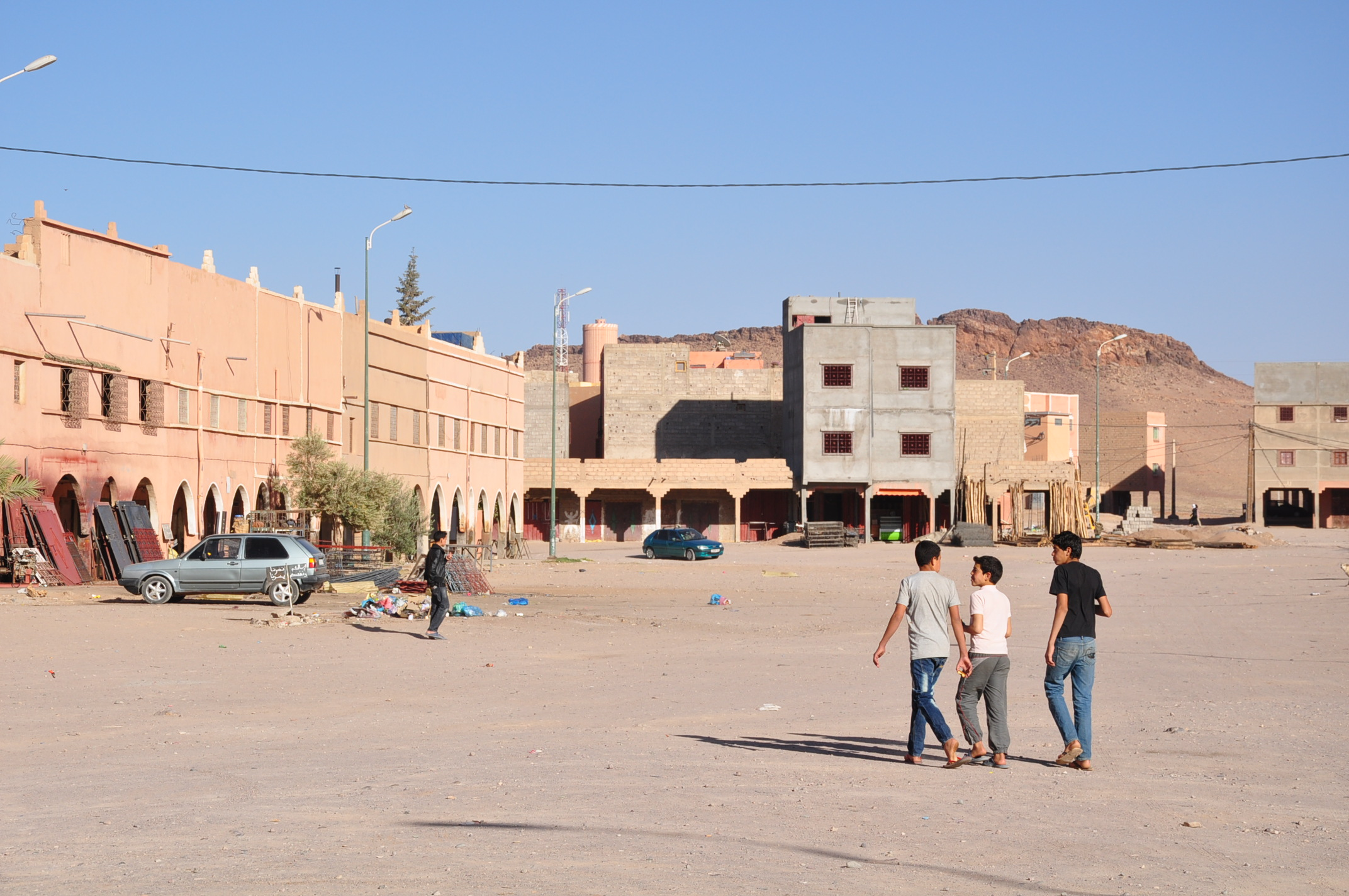
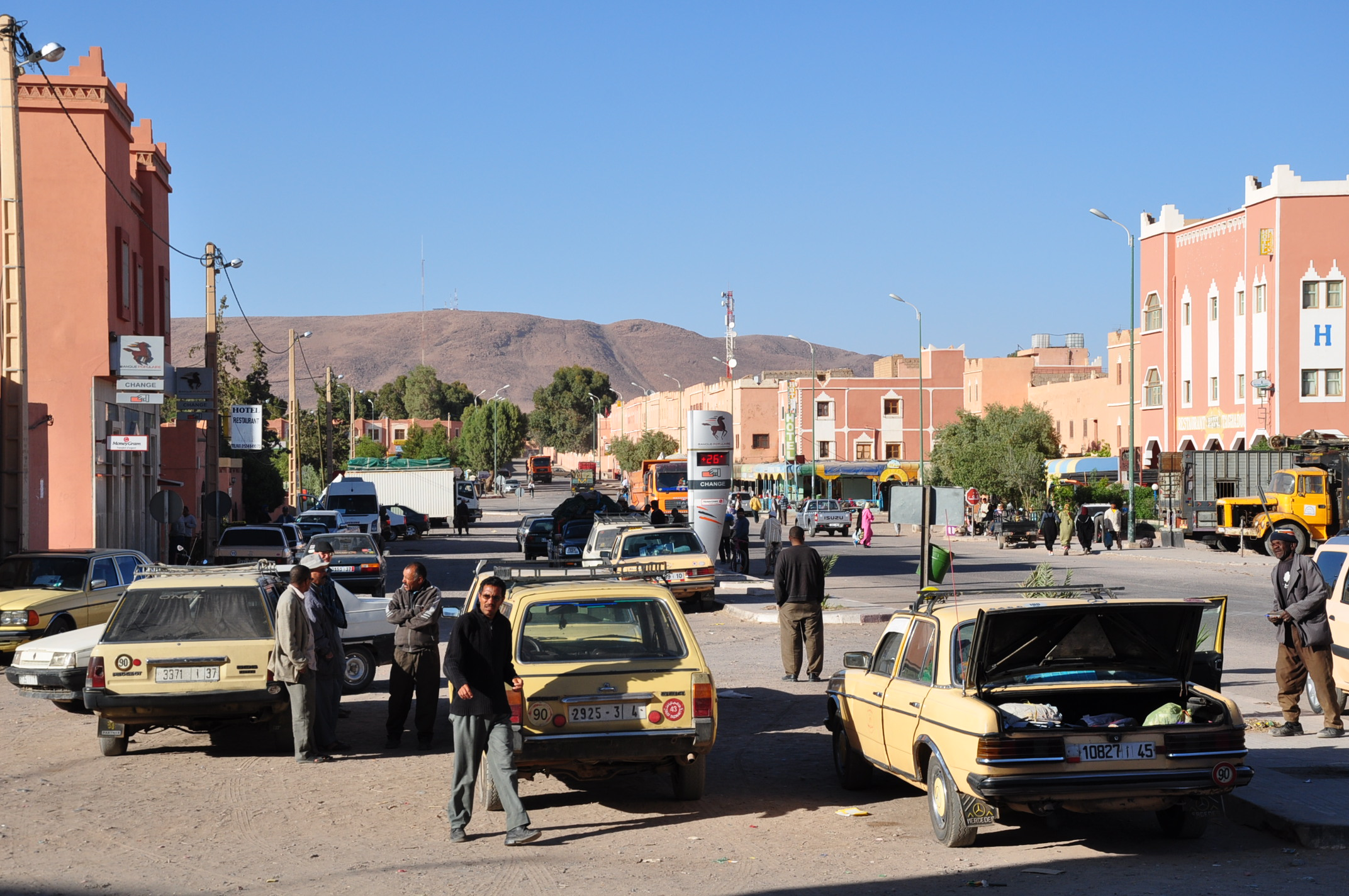
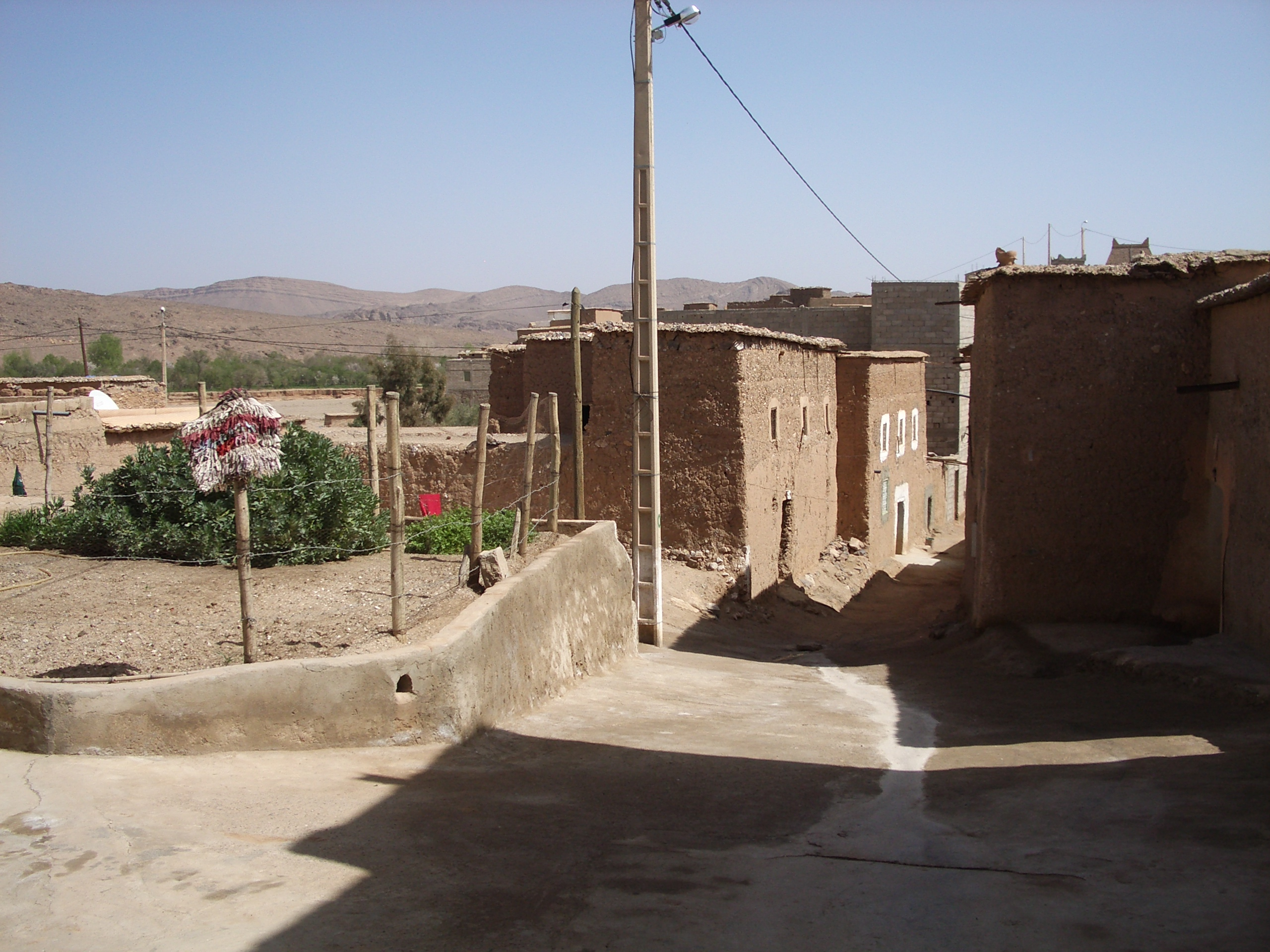
- Interactive map of Taznakht
- Coordinates: 30°34′38.25″N 7°12′17.4″W
- Country: Morocco
- Region: Drâa-Tafilalet
- Province: Ouarzazate Province

Population (2013)
  - Total: 9,149 (est.)
- Time zone: UTC+0 (GMT)

Taznakht (Tachelhit: ⵜⴰⵣⵏⴰⵅⵜ) (Arabic: تازناخت) is a town in Ouarzazate Province, Drâa-Tafilalet region, southern Morocco, on the road from Ouarzazate to Agadir. It had an estimated population of 9,149 in 2013, growing from just 3,813 in 1994. It should not be confused with Tazenakht, which is a village near Errachidia, also in southern Morocco, but more than 400 km further northeast.

== See also ==
- Angarf
