= Kasbah Taourirt =

Historical site in Morocco

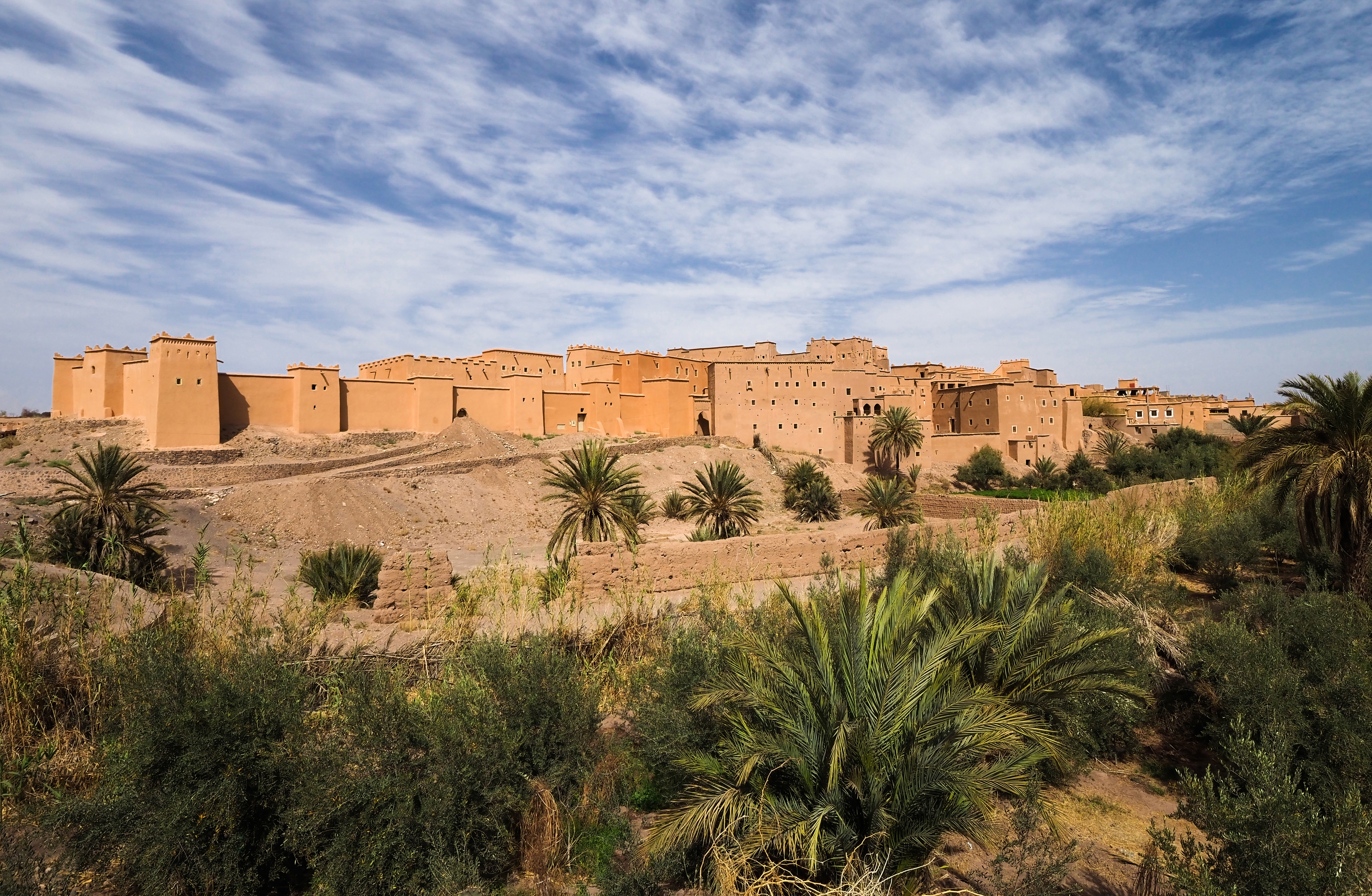
- Kasbah from South
- Coordinates: 30°55′12″N 6°53′57.6″W
- Built: 19th century
- Built for: Glaoui family
- Architectural style(s): Moroccan (Berber) architecture

Kasbah Taourirt is a historic fortified residence complex or kasbah (tighremt in Tamazight) in Ouarzazate, Morocco.

== History ==
According to oral traditions, the kasbah was first built in the 17th century by the Imzwarn, a powerful local family. More certainly, however, the kasbah was taken over and expanded by the Glaoui family in the 19th century. At the height of its importance in the late 19th century, the kasbah controlled an important location at the confluence of several river valleys – including the Draa and the Dadès – which were part of the Saharan trade routes. One of the members of the Glaoui family, Thami El Glaoui, was famously the pasha of Marrakesh during the entirety of French colonial rule over Morocco in the 20th century.

After the end of French colonial rule and the end of Glaoui control over the region, the kasbah was progressively taken over by squatters and began to decay. In 1954, it was added to the Moroccan National Heritage List. In 1956, the property came under Moroccan state control, though ownership was returned to the Glaoui family in the early 1960s. In 1972, the Glaoui family sold the kasbah to the Ouarzazate municipality.

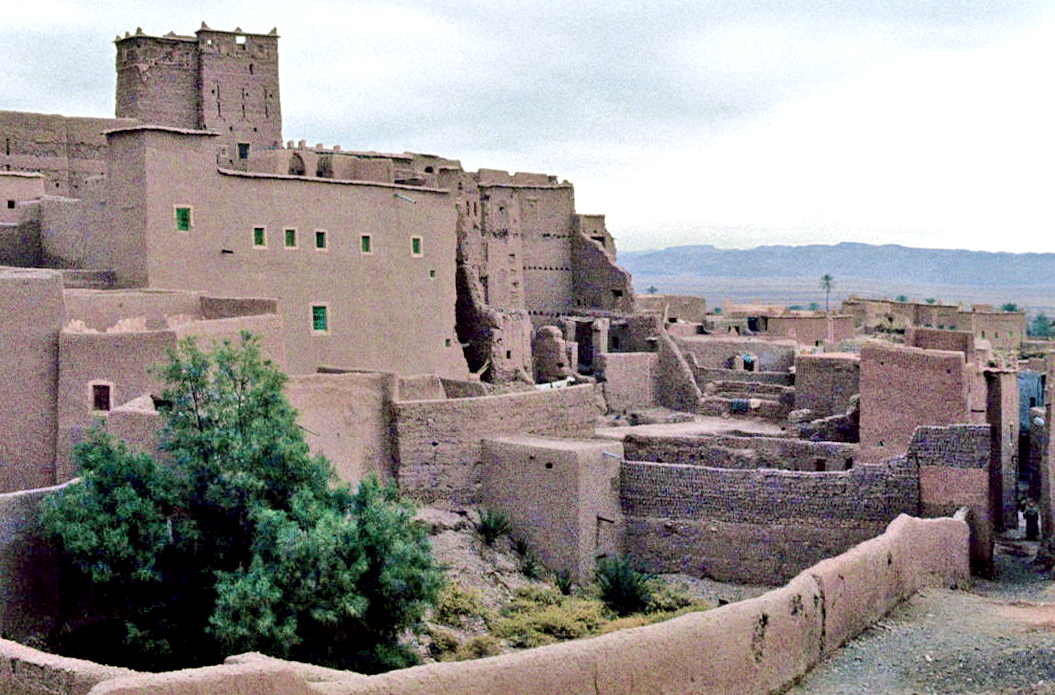
A partly unrestored section of the kasbah, pictured in 1983

The site was abandoned until the late 1980s, when CERKAS (Centre de Conservation et de Réhabilitation du Patrimoine Architectural Atlasiques et Subatlasiques) was established and began to oversee the conservation of Morocco's southern kasbahs. A small part of the kasbah was restored in the 1990s with the help of UNESCO and is now open as a historical attraction. Some unrestored areas of the kasbah are still inhabited by families today. The kasbah has appeared in movies including Gladiator and Prince of Persia.

The site was damaged by the September 2023 earthquake that struck southern Morocco. An early assessment of damage reported cracks and partial collapses in the building and the surrounding historic quarter, with risk of further collapses.

== Architecture ==
The structure is made largely of rammed earth and mud-brick and is among the most impressive and best-preserved examples of its kind. The bulk of the building has three floors and is marked by large square or rectangular towers at its corners, the exteriors of which are decorated with geometric motifs and niches, which is typical of the architecture found in the traditionally Berber-dominated oasis regions of southern Morocco. The exterior of the building is also notable for several projecting balconies or overhanging projections or balconies with windows, some of which overlook the entrance courtyard, as well as more open windows on the upper floors which are guarded with iron bars. Inside, some of the rooms have notable decoration and tataoui ceilings made out of woven reed.

One of the unrestored structures, a former qa'id's residence dating in particular from the time of Qa'id Hammadi (in office 1882– 1939), has particularly rich decoration including carved stucco, wall paintings, and ornate arches which were influenced by the architecture of Morocco's imperial cities.

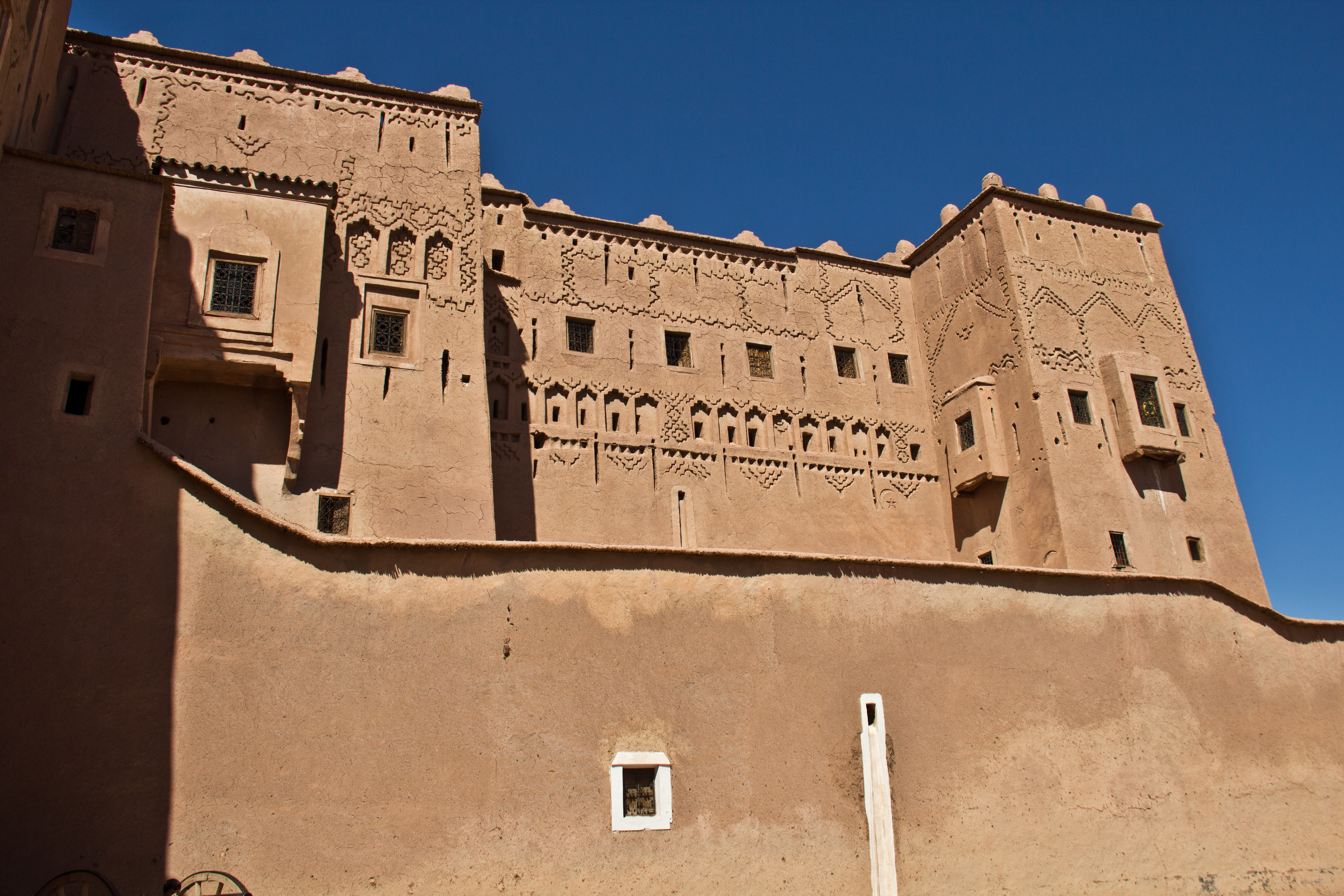
Upper walls and balconies of the kasbah, seen from the entrance courtyard

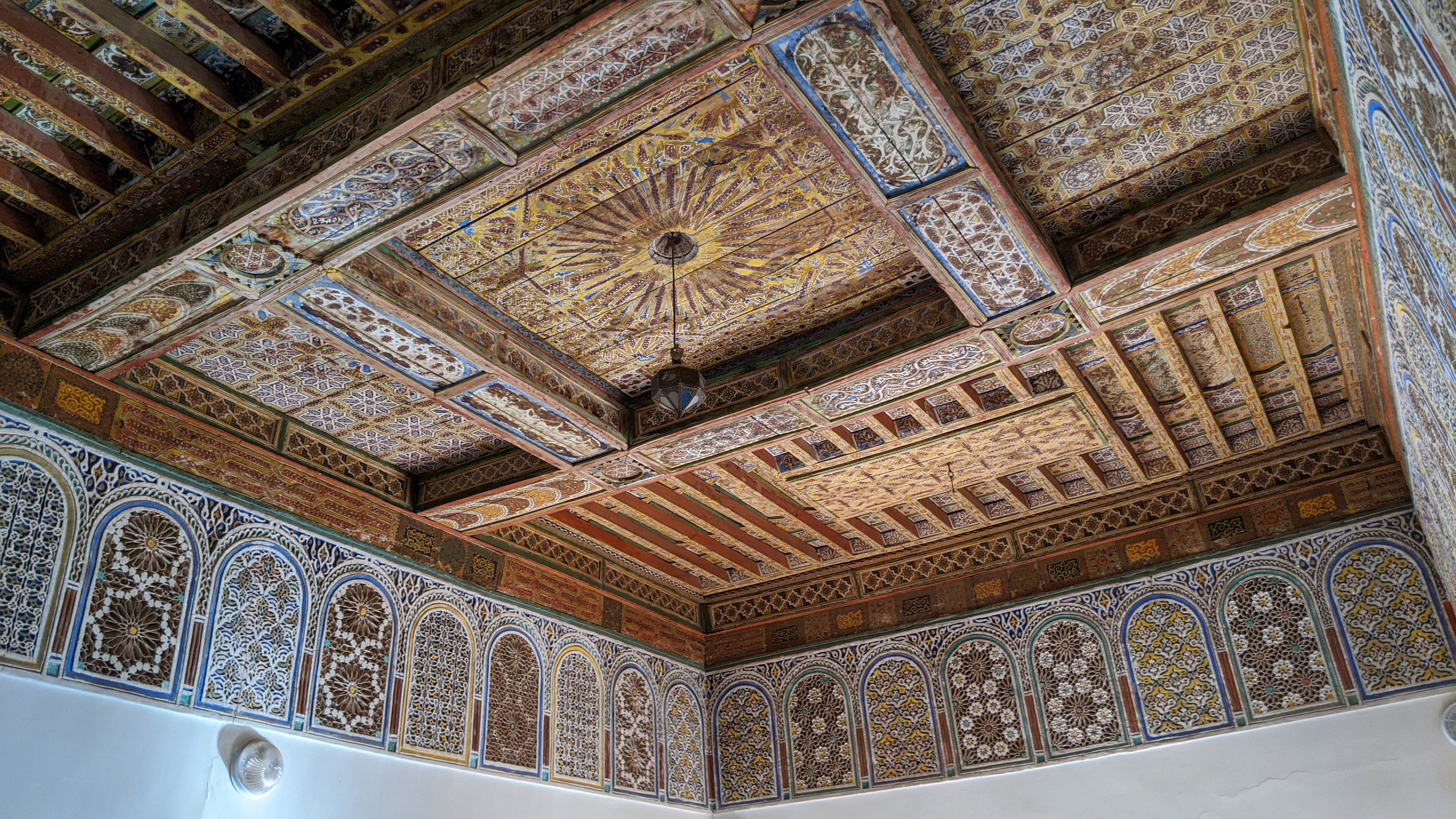
One of the decorated rooms inside the restored section of the kasbah

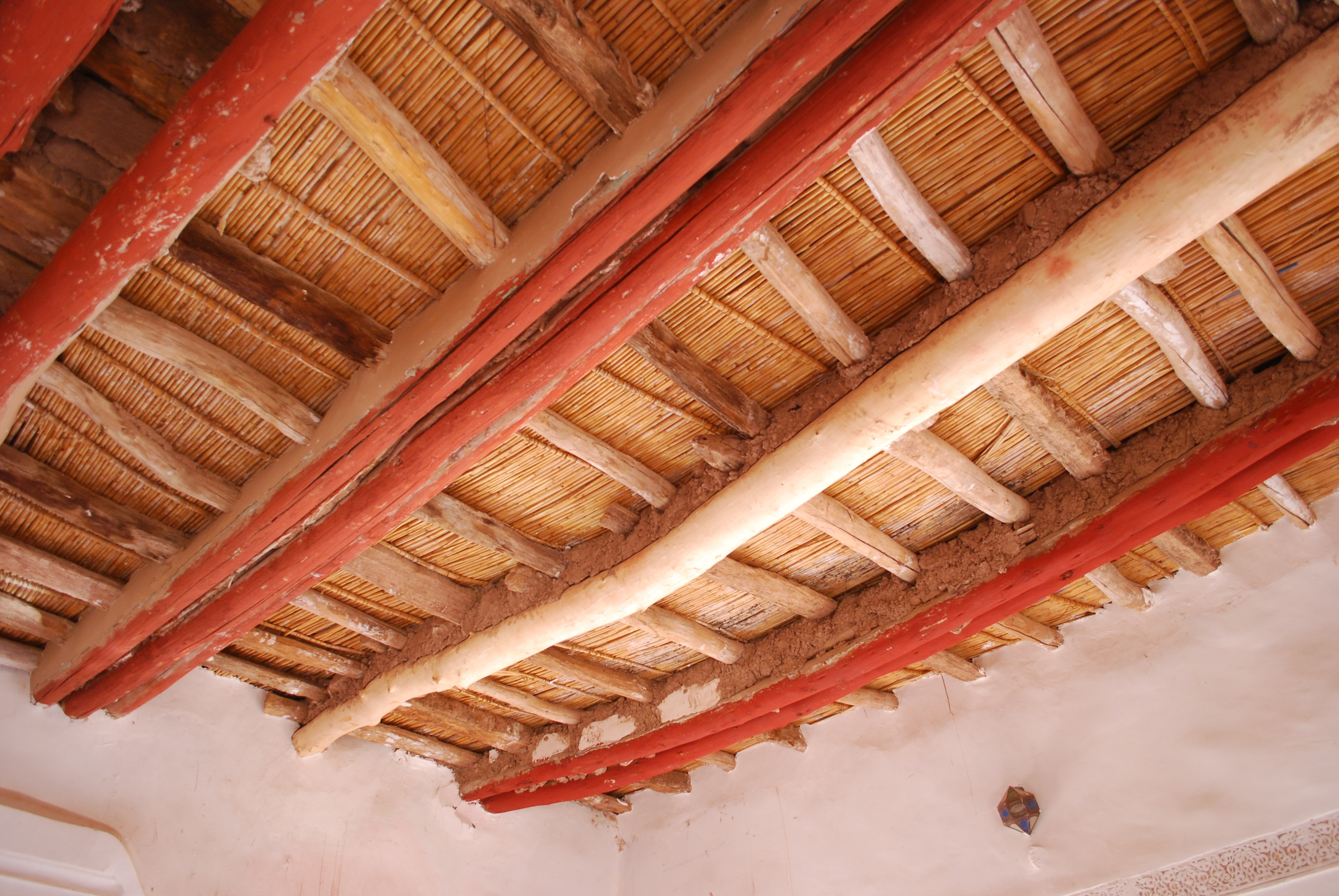
Reed ceiling in one of the rooms

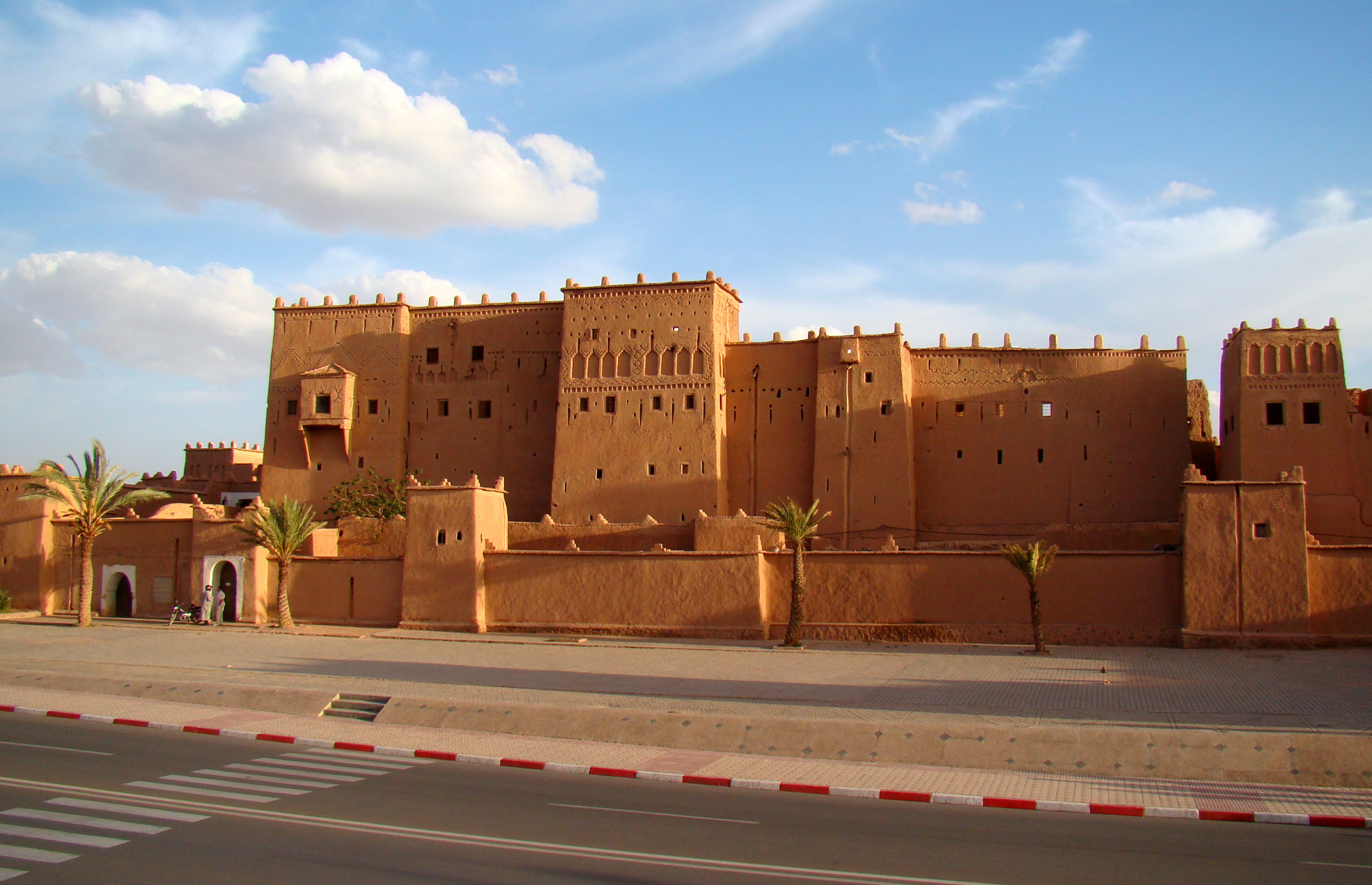
Exterior of the restored section of the kasbah, seen from the main street today

== See also ==
- Telouet Kasbah
- Aït Benhaddou
- Moroccan architecture
