= Rabii el-Jawhari =

Moroccan filmmaker and scholar

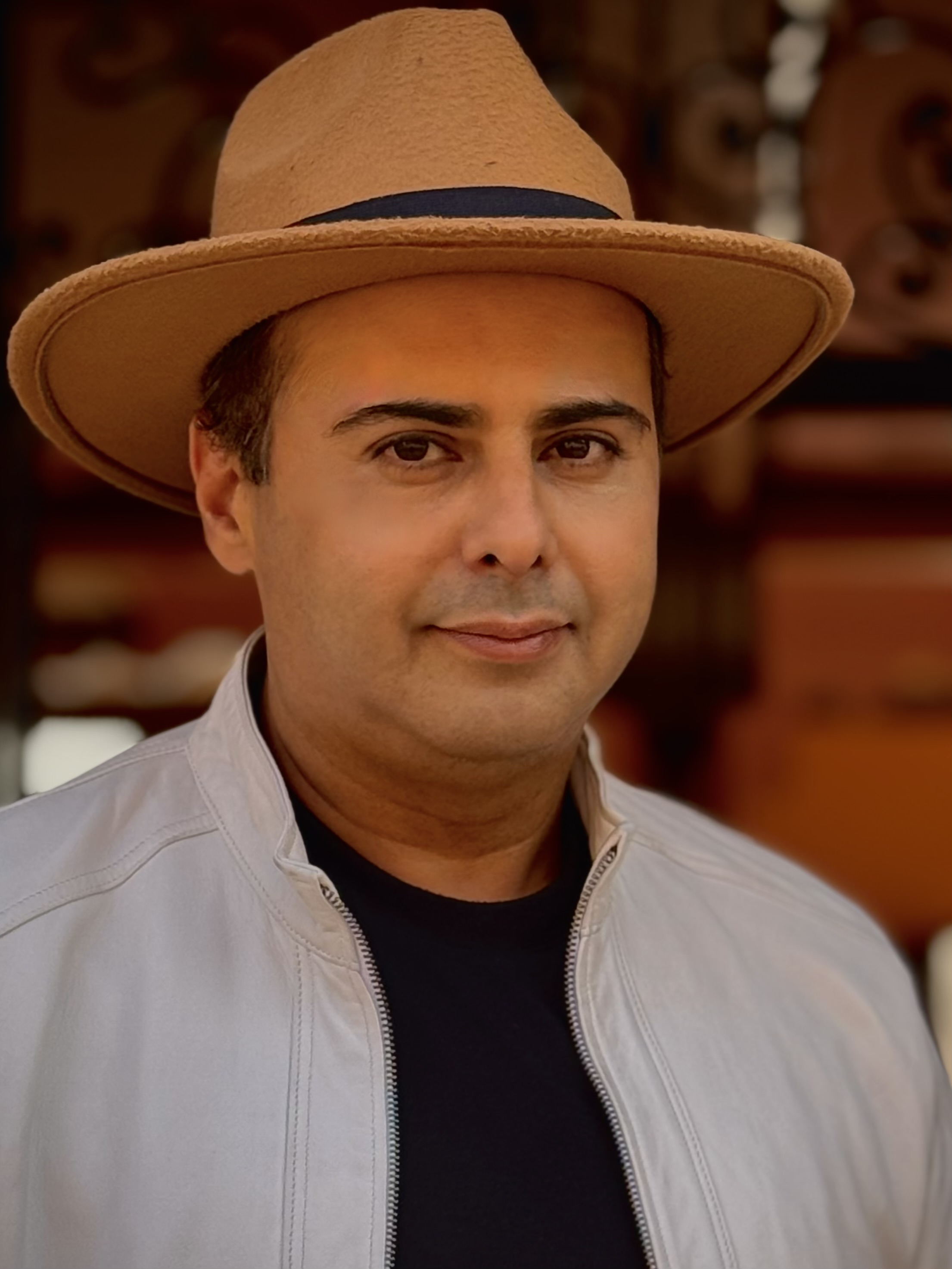
Rabii el-Jawhari

Rabii el-Jawhari is a Moroccan filmmaker who has directed many feature films and documentaries. His early career included roles as second and first assistant director during which he collaborated with a range of international production companies, including American, Italian , British and French films. He also participated in many films as an actor.

In 2011, el Jawhari was selected to participate in the United States International Visitors Program, focusing on documentary filmmaking. He holds a PhD in Film Theory and is active as a scholar in the field. He is the author of the book Cinema in the Age of Helixism, Contemporary Film Directors' Attempt to Transcend Postmodernist Saturation, and has published numerous articles on cinema.

In 2026, el-Jawhari released the first edition of the Ouarzazate International University Film Festival (OIUFF), serving as the festival’s founder and director. He is also the inaugural director of the Center of Excellence for Cinema and Audiovisual at the Multidisciplinary Faculty of Ouarzazate.
