= Tabounte =

Town in Morocco

Coordinates: 30°52′48″N 6°54′36″W

Tabounte تبنت ⵜⴰⴱⵓⵏⵜ
- Town
- Interactive map of Tabounte
- Country: Morocco
- Region: Drâa-Tafilalet
- Province: Ouarzazate Province

Population (2004)
  - Total: 21,198
- Time zone: UTC+0 (GMT)

Tabounte (Arabic: تبنت, Berber languages: ⵜⴰⴱⵓⵏⵜ) is a town in Ouarzazate Province, Drâa-Tafilalet, Morocco. According to the 2004 census it has a population of 21,198.
