= Ouarzazate =

City in Drâa-Tafilalet, Morocco

Ouarzazate ⵡⴰⵔⵣⴰⵣⴰⵜ ورزازات
- City
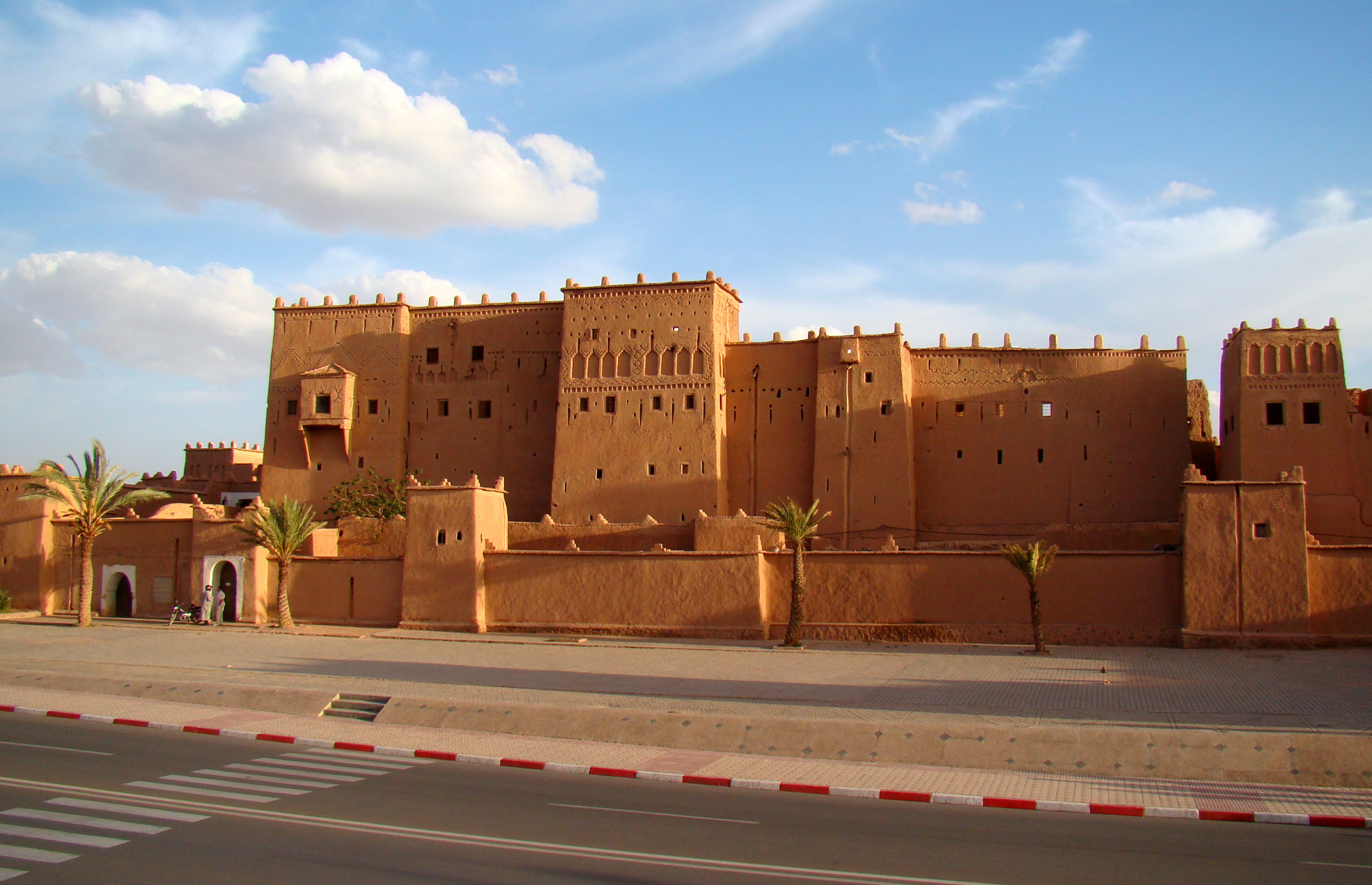
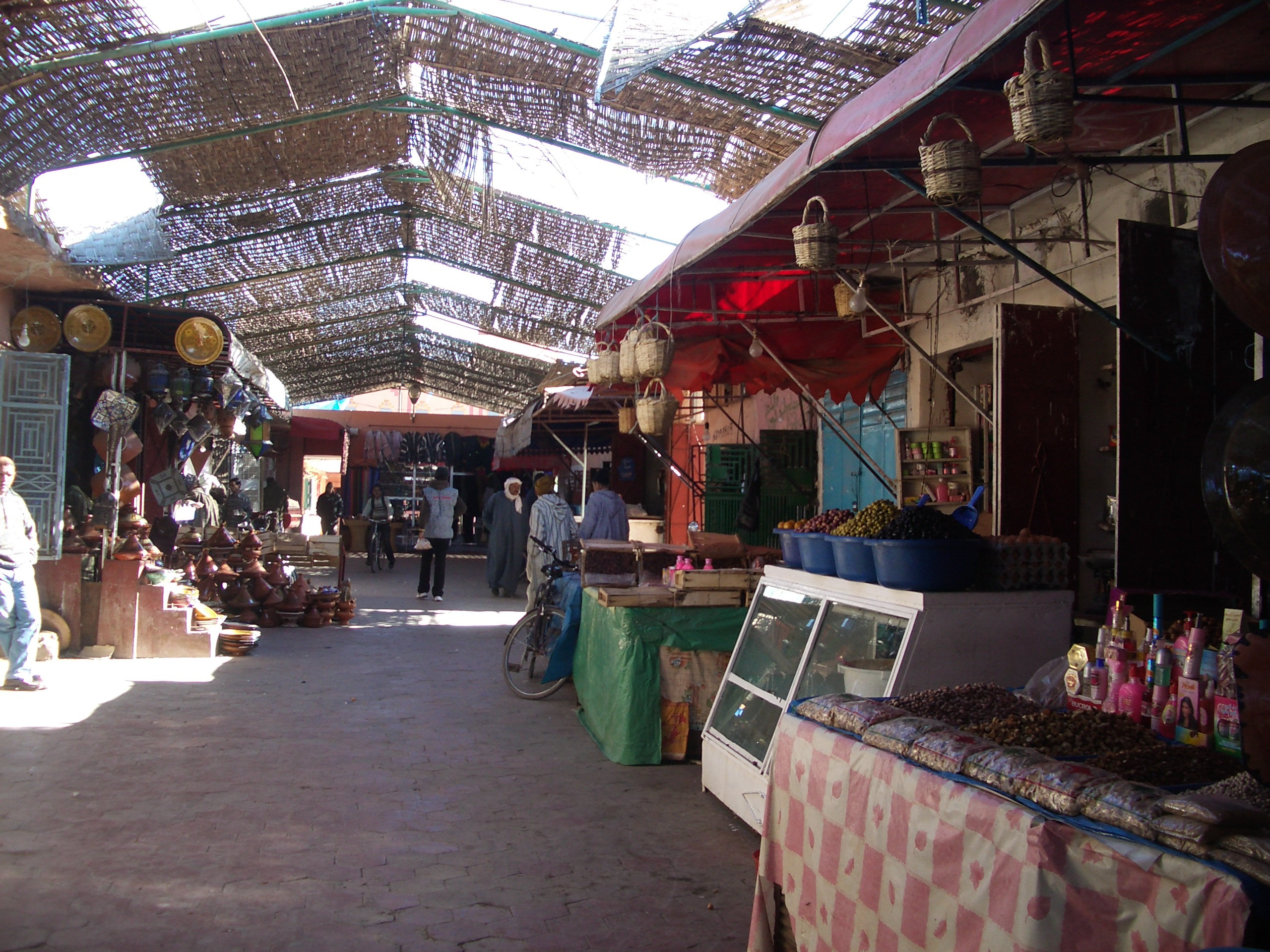
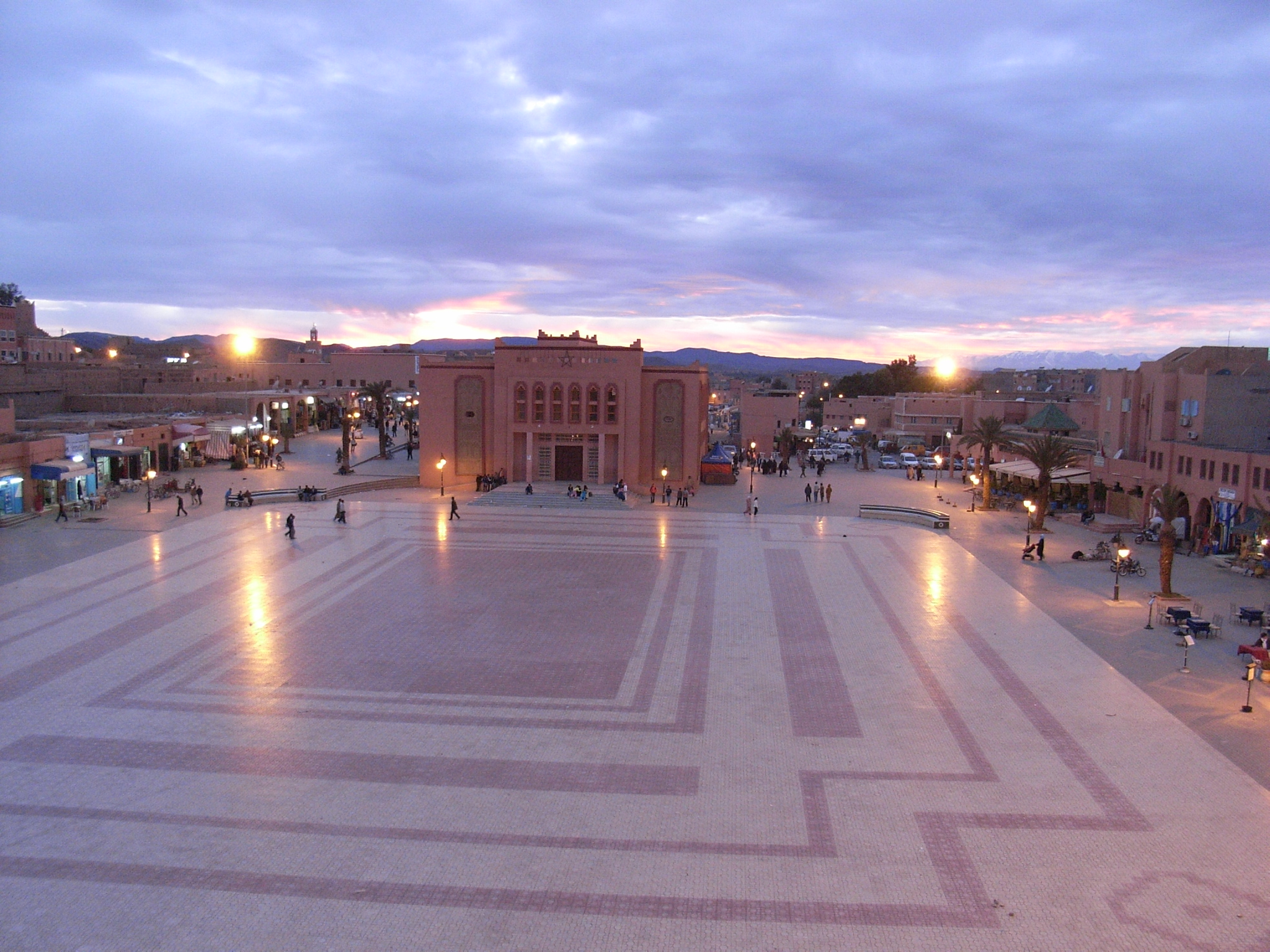
- Nickname: Door of the Desert
- Interactive map of Ouarzazate
- Coordinates: 30°55′N 6°55′W
- Country: Morocco
- Region: Drâa-Tafilalet
- Province: Ouarzazate
- Elevation: 1,151 m (3,776 ft)

Population (2024)
  - Total: 79,218
  - Density: 233/km^{2} (600/sq mi)
- Time zone: UTC+0 (GMT)
- Postal code: 45000

Ouarzazate (/ˌwɑːrzəˈzæt, -ˈzɑːt/; Standard Moroccan Tamazight: ⵡⴰⵔⵣⴰⵣⴰⵜ Arabic: ورزازات, romanized: Warzāzāt, IPA: [warzaːˈzaːt]) is a city and capital of Ouarzazate Province in the region of Drâa-Tafilalet, south-central Morocco.

Ouarzazate is a primary tourist destination as well as a starting point for excursions into and across the Draa Valley and the desert. The fortified village Aït Benhaddou west of the city is a UNESCO World Heritage Site.

The Ouarzazate area is a noted film-making location, with Morocco's biggest studios inviting many international companies to work here. Films such as Lawrence of Arabia (1962), The Man Who Would Be King (1975), The Living Daylights (1987), The Last Temptation of Christ (1988), The Mummy (1999), Gladiator (2000), Kingdom of Heaven (2005), Kundun (1997), Legionnaire (1998), The Hills Have Eyes (2006), Salmon Fishing in the Yemen (2011), The Wages of Fear (2024) and The Odyssey (2026) were shot here, as was part of the TV series Game of Thrones. It was the filming location for the fictional city of Agapenta in the fourth season of the Netflix series Outer Banks.

== Etymology ==
Originally, the name Ouarzazate did not designate an urban settlement, but rather the topographical feature of a riverbed : In Tachelhit, the name is formed from the elements War meaning "without", and Zazat meaning "noise" or "confusion", This expression historically referred to a specific point along the local river where the channel widens after emerging from the narrow passage coming from Ait Zineb, softening the sound of its flow, before narrowing once again toward the Draa River.

Early historical documents such as confirm this geographical origin by explicitly referring to "Oued Ouarzazate" long before any modern town existed. Al-Bakri's Book of Roads and Kingdoms mentions Ouarzazate as a territory belonging to the Haskoura tribe rather than a city, The later popular interpretation of the phrase as "the quiet city" represents a secondary extension derived from the original meaning tied to the river.

== History ==
For a long time, Ouarzazate was a small crossing point for African traders on their way to northern Morocco and Europe. In the 16th century, Sheikh Abu al-'Abaas Ahmed bin Abdellah al-Wizkiti al-Warzazi, emir of the qasba of Ouarzazate and father of Lalla Masuda, helped establish Saadi control over the Sous-Dra'a region.

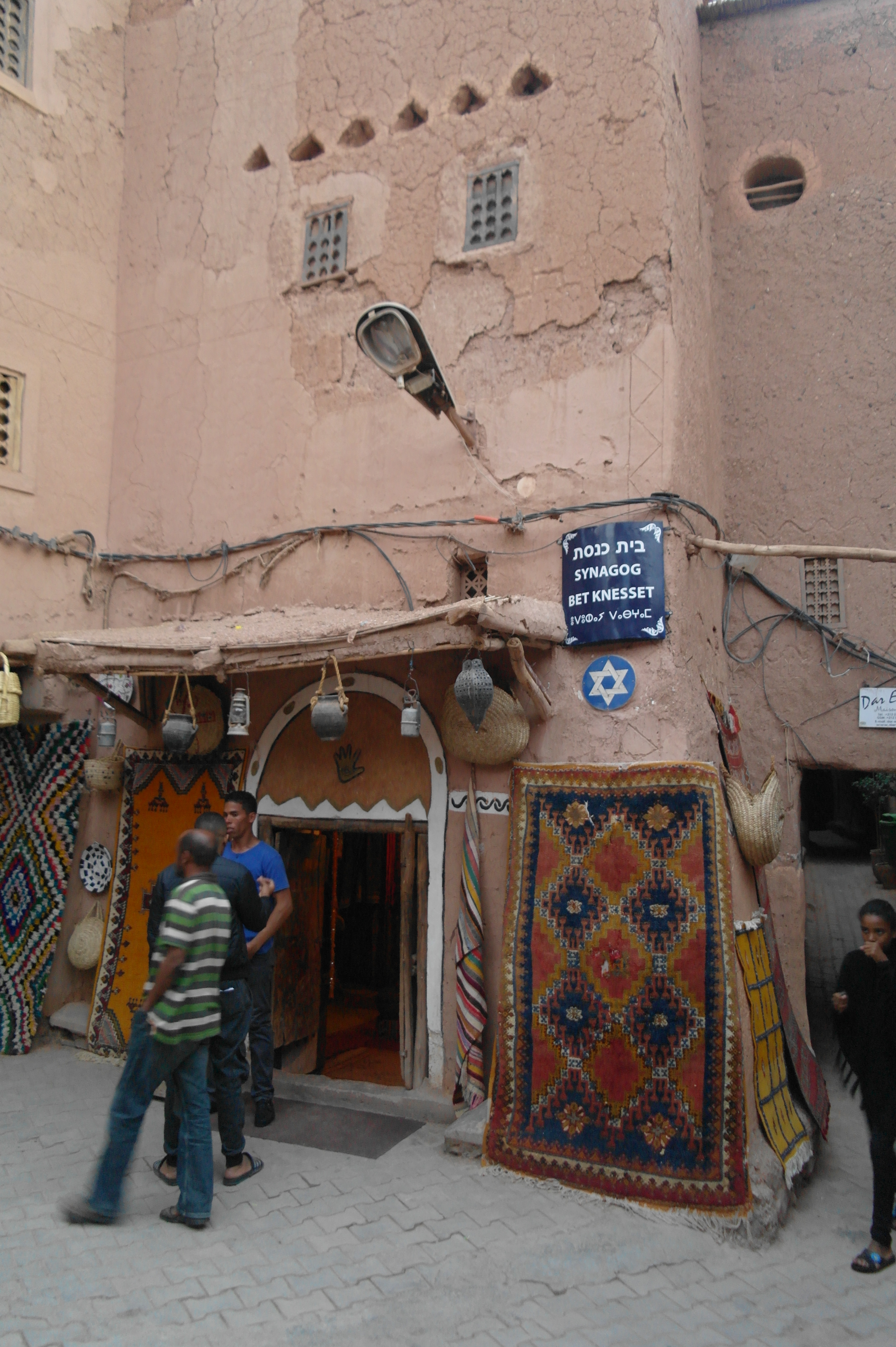
Former Bet Knesset Synagogue, also known as the "Old Synagogue"

Ouarzazate was home to a thriving Jewish community. In 1954, about 170 Jews lived in the Mellah. The "Old Synagogue", a synagogue said to be nearly 300 years old, is located in Ouarzazate. There is also a Jewish cemetery, which is no longer in use.

During the French period, Ouarzazate expanded considerably as a garrison town, administrative centre and customs post and a church (Eglise Saint Therese) was built in 1931. It is home to the Kasbah Taourirt, which was the kasbah of the former caïd and later owned by T'hami El Glaoui. The Krupp field gun which secured Glaoui power is displayed outside the kasbah today.

The city was part of the route of the 2006 and 2007 Dakar Rally.

The nearby Ouarzazate solar power station, co-funded by the Arab League, was connected to the Moroccan power grid in February 2016.

On 1 November 2023, Ouarzazate along with Casablanca joined UNESCO’s Creative Cities Network.

== Geography ==
Ouarzazate is at an elevation of 1,151 metres (3,776 ft) in the middle of a bare plateau south of the High Atlas Mountains and the Dadès Gorges, with the Jbel Saghro and the Sahara desert to the city's south.

The city is crossed by Assif Iriri, a tributary of the Draa river. To the east of Ouarzazate lies the El Mansour Eddahbi Reservoir.

== Climate ==
Taourirt Kasbah covered in snow

Ouarzazate has a hot desert climate (Köppen climate classification BWh). The city is hot and dry in summer, but can be very cold in winter, with icy winds coming from the High Atlas Mountains.

The city of Ouarzazate sometimes experiences snowfall.

Climate data for Ouarzazate (Ouarzazate Airport) (1991–2020, extremes 1941–1963 and 1965–present) (Note: The record highs and lows are based on the Deutscher Wetterdienst link for the period 1941–1963 while records beyond 1965 come from the Meteo Climat link. As a result, the most extreme values from either source are used.)
Month	Jan	Feb	Mar	Apr	May	Jun	Jul	Aug	Sep	Oct	Nov	Dec	Year
Record high °C (°F)	26.6 (79.9)	29.8 (85.6)	32.7 (90.9)	35.0 (95.0)	39.2 (102.6)	43.6 (110.5)	43.4 (110.1)	44.0 (111.2)	43.2 (109.8)	36.3 (97.3)	31.2 (88.2)	27.2 (81.0)	44.0 (111.2)
Mean daily maximum °C (°F)	17.3 (63.1)	19.3 (66.7)	22.7 (72.9)	26.7 (80.1)	30.7 (87.3)	35.5 (95.9)	38.8 (101.8)	37.5 (99.5)	33.1 (91.6)	27.5 (81.5)	21.7 (71.1)	17.7 (63.9)	27.4 (81.3)
Daily mean °C (°F)	9.6 (49.3)	11.9 (53.4)	15.5 (59.9)	19.3 (66.7)	23.2 (73.8)	27.6 (81.7)	30.8 (87.4)	29.8 (85.6)	25.6 (78.1)	20.4 (68.7)	14.5 (58.1)	10.5 (50.9)	19.9 (67.8)
Mean daily minimum °C (°F)	1.8 (35.2)	4.5 (40.1)	8.2 (46.8)	11.9 (53.4)	15.7 (60.3)	19.6 (67.3)	22.7 (72.9)	22.1 (71.8)	18.1 (64.6)	13.3 (55.9)	7.2 (45.0)	3.2 (37.8)	12.4 (54.3)
Record low °C (°F)	−7.0 (19.4)	−5.4 (22.3)	−2.0 (28.4)	−1.0 (30.2)	3.6 (38.5)	7.6 (45.7)	13.0 (55.4)	12.6 (54.7)	9.0 (48.2)	4.0 (39.2)	−2.6 (27.3)	−4.9 (23.2)	−7.0 (19.4)
Average precipitation mm (inches)	5.5 (0.22)	14.2 (0.56)	16.5 (0.65)	6.6 (0.26)	4.4 (0.17)	6.6 (0.26)	3.8 (0.15)	12.3 (0.48)	13.2 (0.52)	14.8 (0.58)	7.8 (0.31)	9.5 (0.37)	115.2 (4.54)
Average precipitation days (≥ 1.0 mm)	1.0	1.7	2.2	1.0	0.9	1.1	1.0	2.6	1.7	2.0	1.3	1.6	18.1
Average relative humidity (%)	54	46	42	38	33	27	22	27	34	42	61	64	41
Mean monthly sunshine hours	261.8	251.5	291.7	317.8	343.2	336.7	316.3	294.9	273.2	273.1	256.5	250.3	3,467
Source 1: NOAA (sun 1981–2010)
Source 2: Deutscher Wetterdienst (record highs for February, May, July, August, and November, record lows, and humidity) Meteo Climat (all other record highs and record lows for June, July, September and October only)

== Landmarks ==
The Kasbah Taourirt is the city's historic kasbah (fortified residence, or tighremt in Berber languages). It was owned and expanded by the Glaoui family in the late 19th century and the 20th century. Built mainly of rammed earth, it is one of the most impressive examples of this type of structure, which characterizes the architecture of the predominantly Berber-inhabited Atlas mountain and oasis regions of Morocco.

A short distance west of the city is Aït Benhaddou, a historic ksar (fortified village) and a UNESCO World Heritage Site.

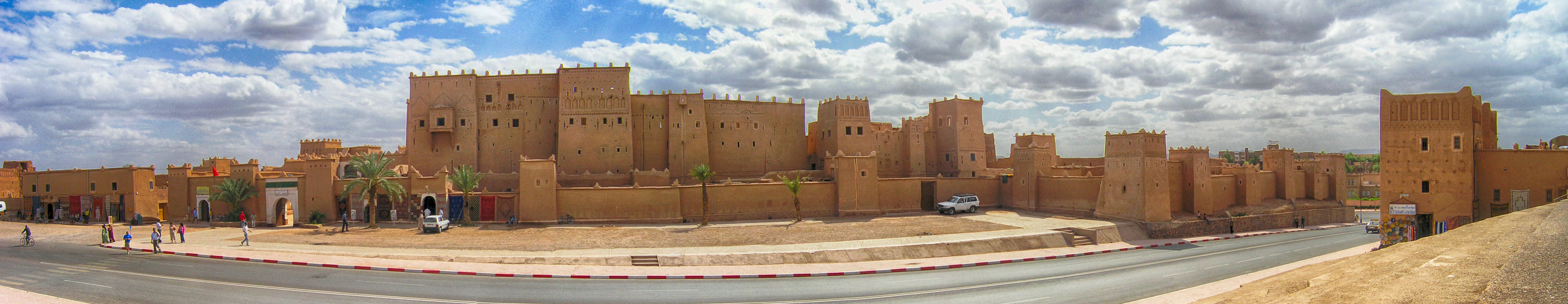
Front view (north side) of the Kasbah Taourirt

== Film industry ==
Film is a major industry in Ouarazazate and constitute a major part of its economy. Its success is due to the presence of desert landscapes and historical architecture, the availability of trained technicians, low productions costs, and Morocco's streamlined process for obtaining film permits. Most productions are from the USA or Western Europe, but the number of Indian and Chinese productions has also increased in recent years. According to a study published in 2020, about 20 to 50 foreign film and television productions are shot in Ouarzazate every year. In 2017, the heads of Moroccan film studios claimed that about 80 percent of staff used on film productions were Moroccan.

Atlas Studios is the largest movie studios in the world in terms of land area. It was established in 1983. Movies were shot here including The Living Daylights, Asterix & Obelix: Mission Cleopatra, Lawrence of Arabia, The Man Who Would Be King, The Mummy, Kingdom of Heaven, Gladiator, Hanna, and Babel. It was also the location of an episode of the television series The Amazing Race 10 and Game of Thrones season 3. Prison Break season 5 was filmed here.

Another large studio in Ouarzazate is CLA Studios, established in 2004.

The Cinema Museum, located across from the Kasbah Taourirt, opened in 2007 and is housed in a former film studio. The museum displays film sets, props, and technical equipment from previous productions.

== Notable people ==
- Adib Alkhalidey, Canadian actor, born in Ouarzazate
- Ayoub El Amloud, professional footballer
- Romain Saiss, professional footballer
- Tasuta N-Imal, a desert blues band

== Gallery ==
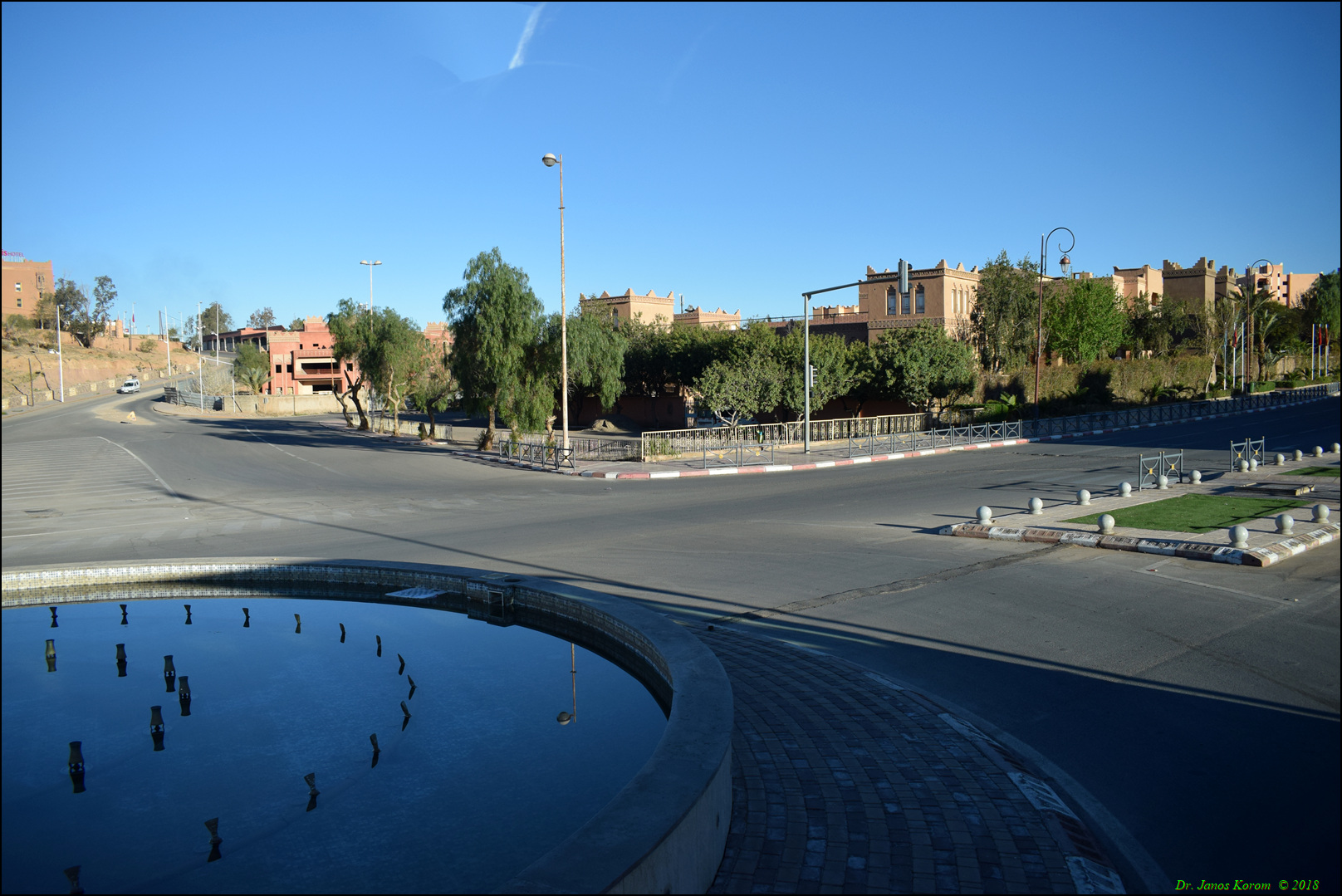
A street in Ouarzazate

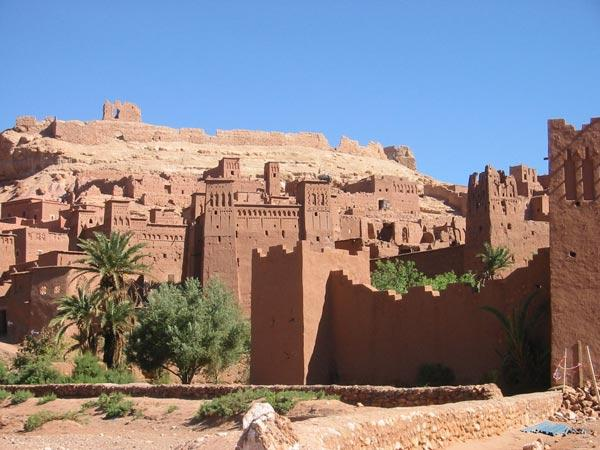
Kasbah Ait Benhaddou

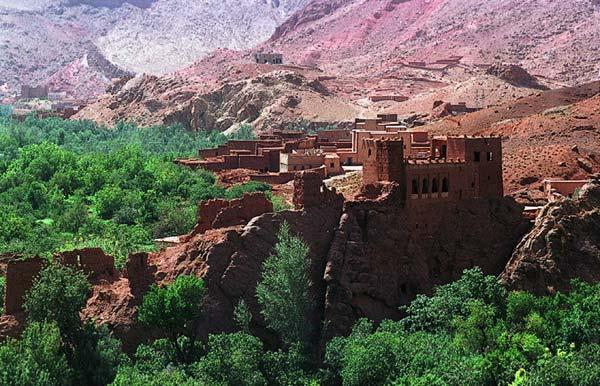
Kasbah Aksar

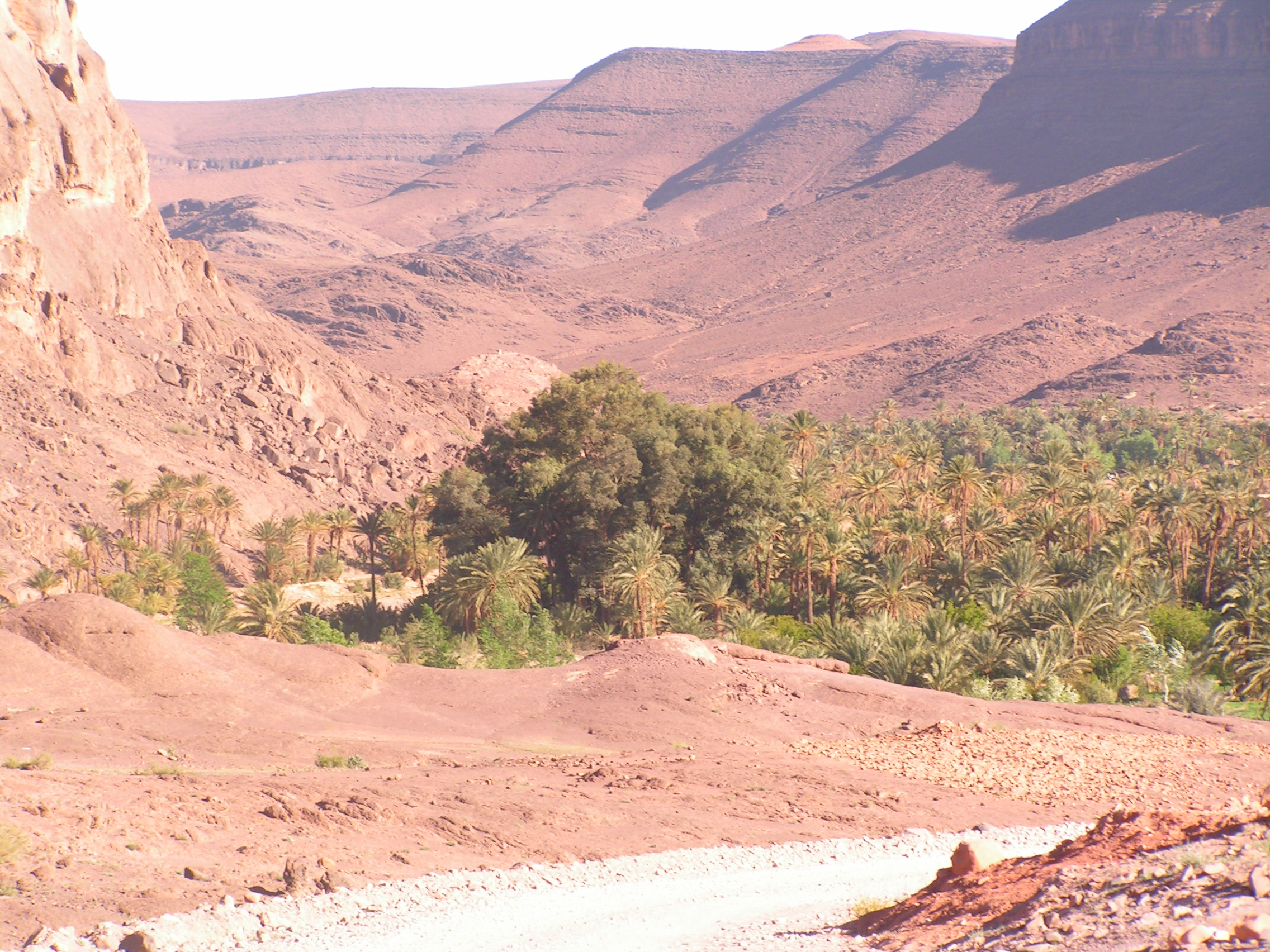
Oasis du Fint

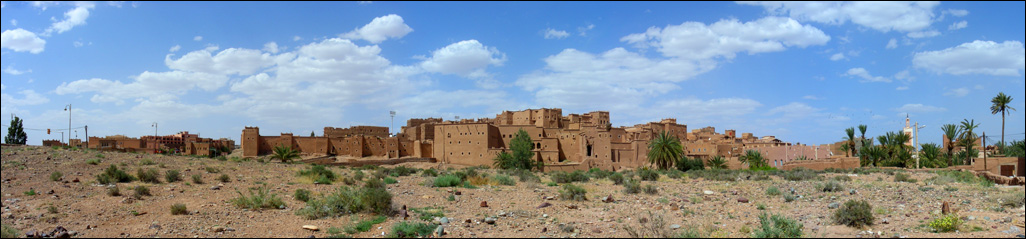
The back side of Kasbah Taourirt

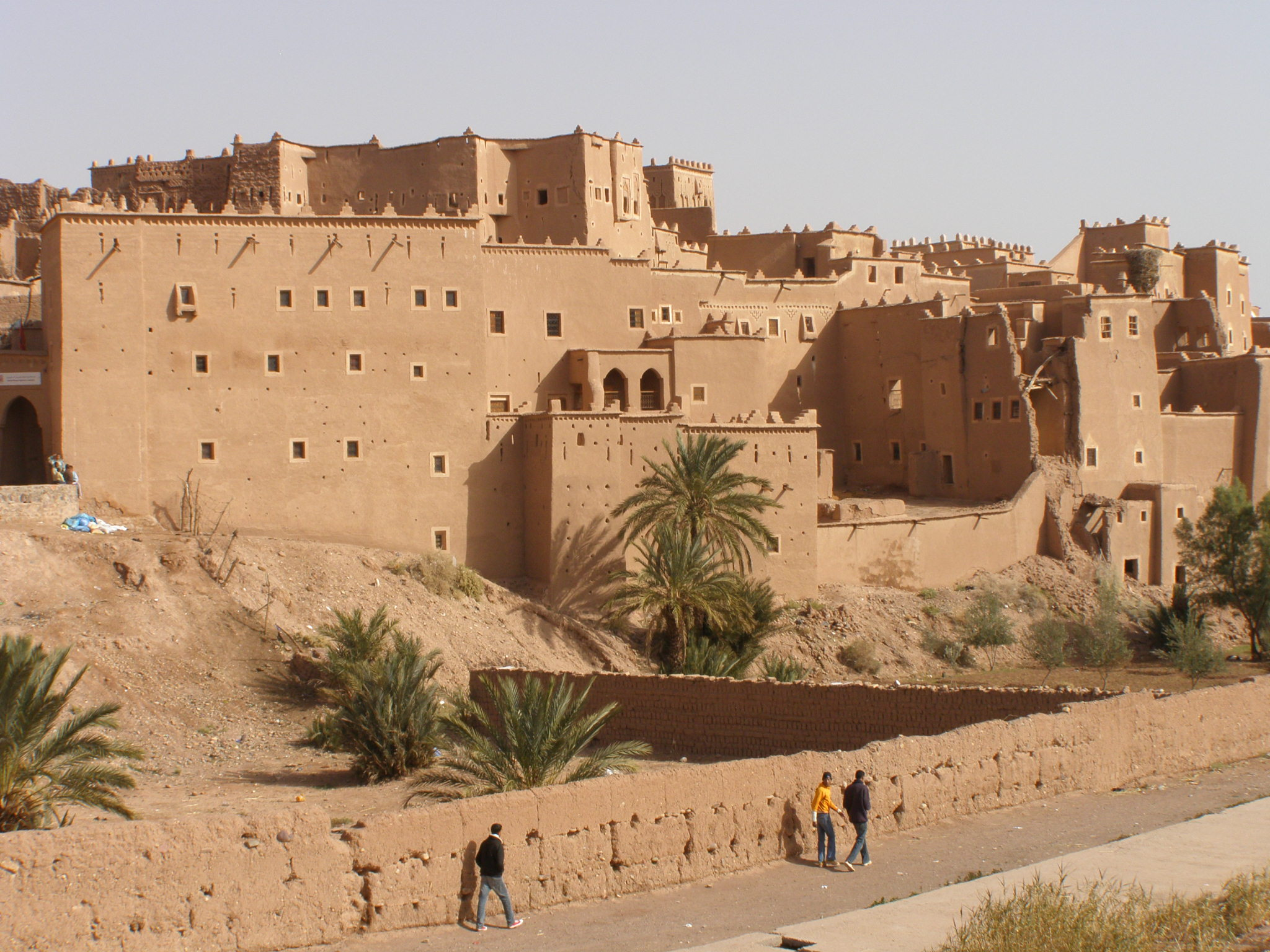
Ouarzazate old town

== See also ==
- Tizi n'Tichka – mountain pass that connects Ouarzazate and Marrakesh
- List of movies shot in Morocco
- Ouarzazate Airport
- Ouarzazate solar power station
