= Aït Benhaddou =

Historical village in southeastern Morocco

Ksar of Ait-Ben-Haddou
UNESCO World Heritage Site
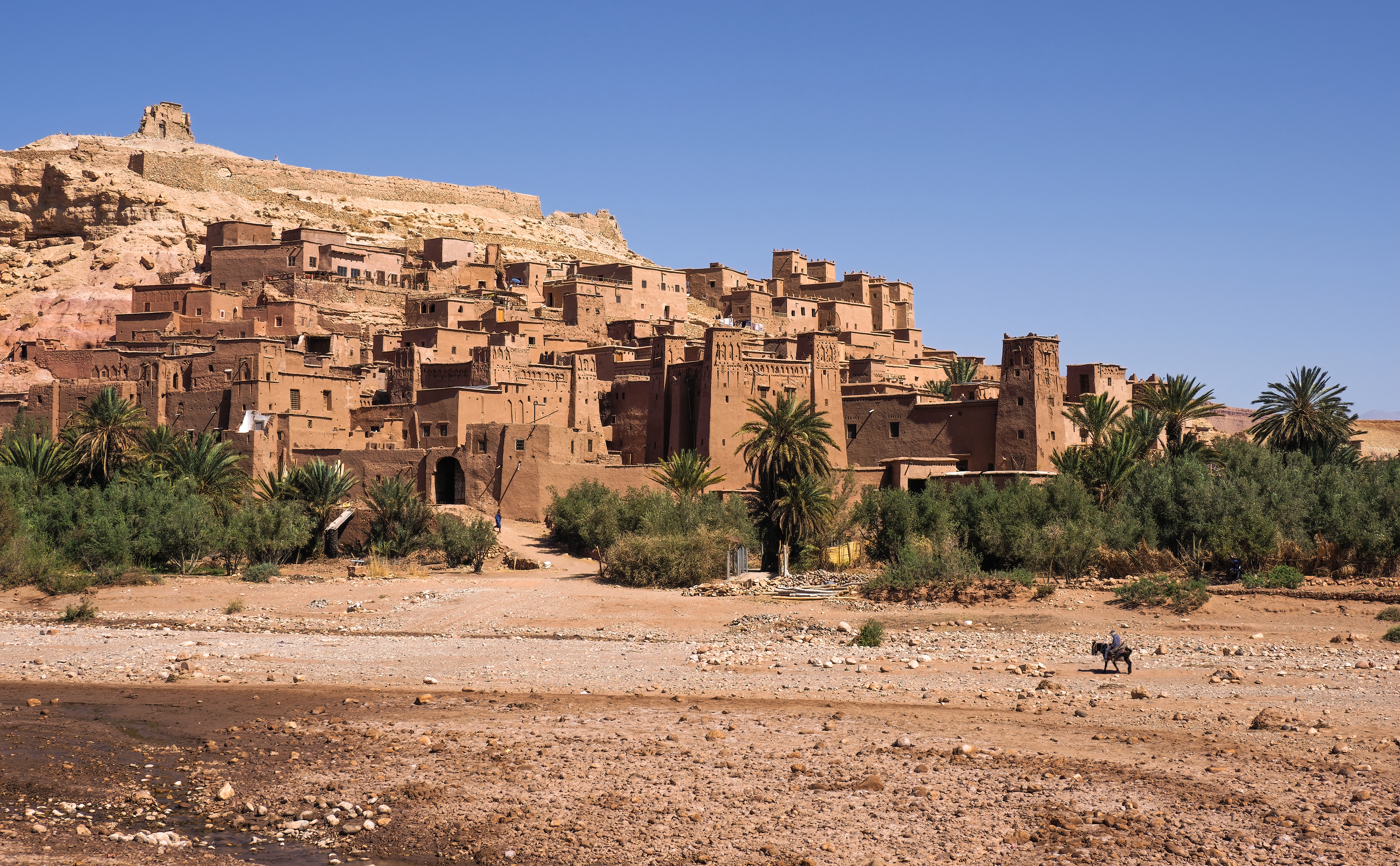
- Aït Benhaddou
- Interactive map of Ksar of Ait-Ben-Haddou
- Official name: Ksar of Ait-Ben-Haddou
- Location: Ait Zineb, Ouarzazate Province, Morocco
- Criteria: Cultural: (iv), (v)
- Reference: 444
- Inscription: 1987 (11th Session)
- Area: 3.03 ha (0.0117 sq mi)
- Buffer zone: 16.32 ha (0.0630 sq mi)
- Coordinates: 31°2′50″N 7°7′44″W

Aït Benhaddou (Berber languages: ⵉⵖⵔⵎ ⵏ ⴰⵢⵜ ⴱⵏ ⵃⴷⴷⵓ, Arabic: آيت بن حدّو) is a historic ighrem or ksar (fortified village) along the former caravan route between the Sahara and Marrakesh in Morocco. It is considered a great example of Moroccan earthen clay architecture and has been a UNESCO World Heritage Site since 1987.

== History ==
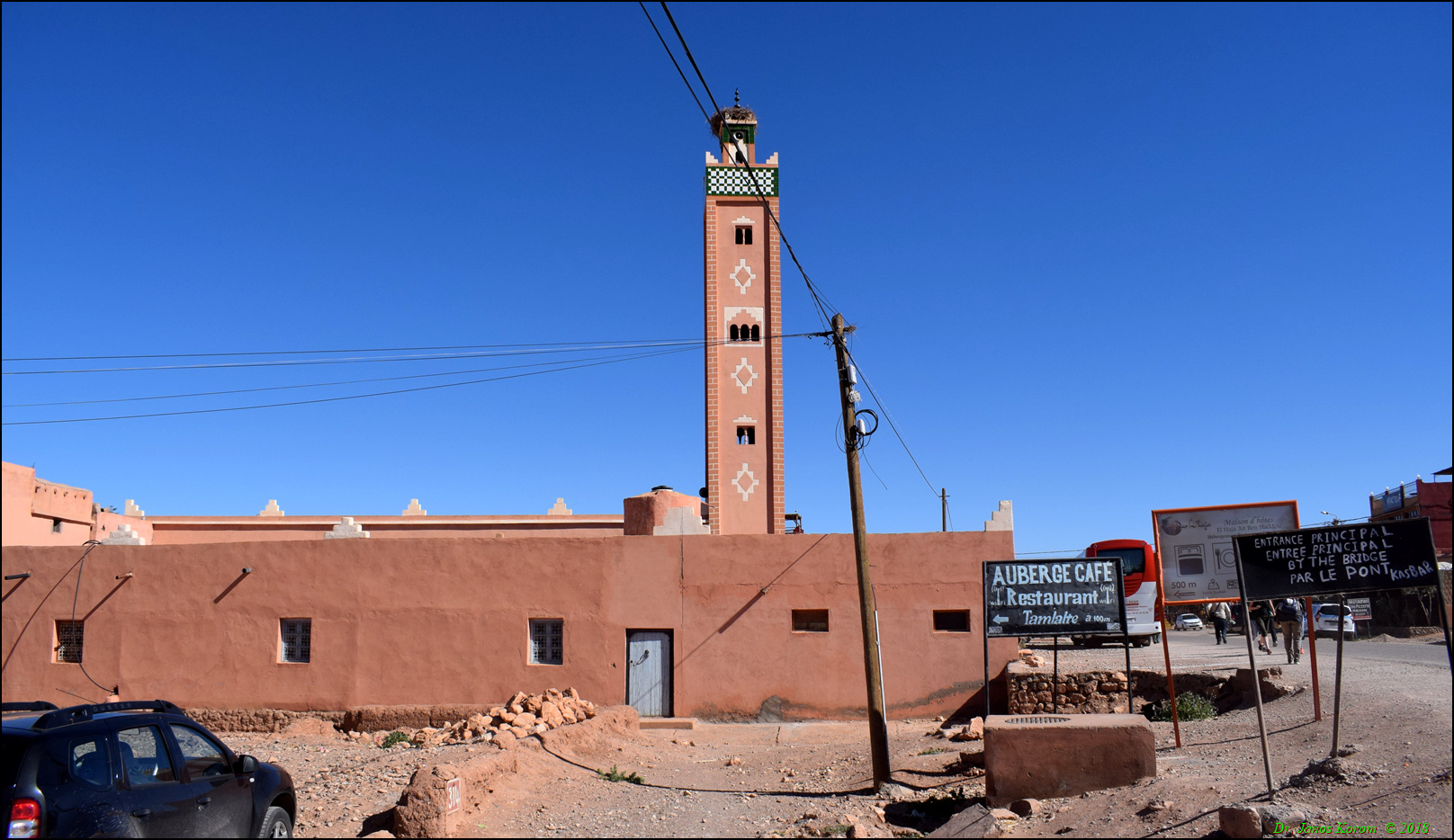
Mosque in the modern village where most residents now live, across the valley from the old ksar

The site of the ksar has been fortified since the 11th century during the Almoravid period. None of the current buildings are believed to date from before the 17th century, but they were likely built with the same construction methods and designs as had been used for centuries before. The site's strategic importance was due to its location in the Ounila Valley along one of the main trans-Saharan trade routes. The Tizi n'Tichka pass, which was reached via this route, was one of the few routes across the Atlas Mountains, crossing between Marrakech and the Dra'a Valley on the edge of the Sahara. Other kasbahs and ksour were located all along this route, such as the nearby Tamdaght to the north.

Today, the ksar itself is only sparsely inhabited by several families. The depopulation over time is a result of the valley's loss of strategic importance in the 20th century. Most local inhabitants now live in modern dwellings in the village on the other side of the river, and make a living off agriculture and especially off the tourist trade. In 2011 a new pedestrian bridge was completed linking the old ksar with the modern village, with the aim of making the ksar more accessible and to potentially encourage inhabitants to move back into its historic houses.

The site was damaged by the September 2023 earthquake that struck southern Morocco. An early assessment of the damage reported cracks and partial collapses, with risk of further collapses.

== Description ==
=== Layout of the site ===
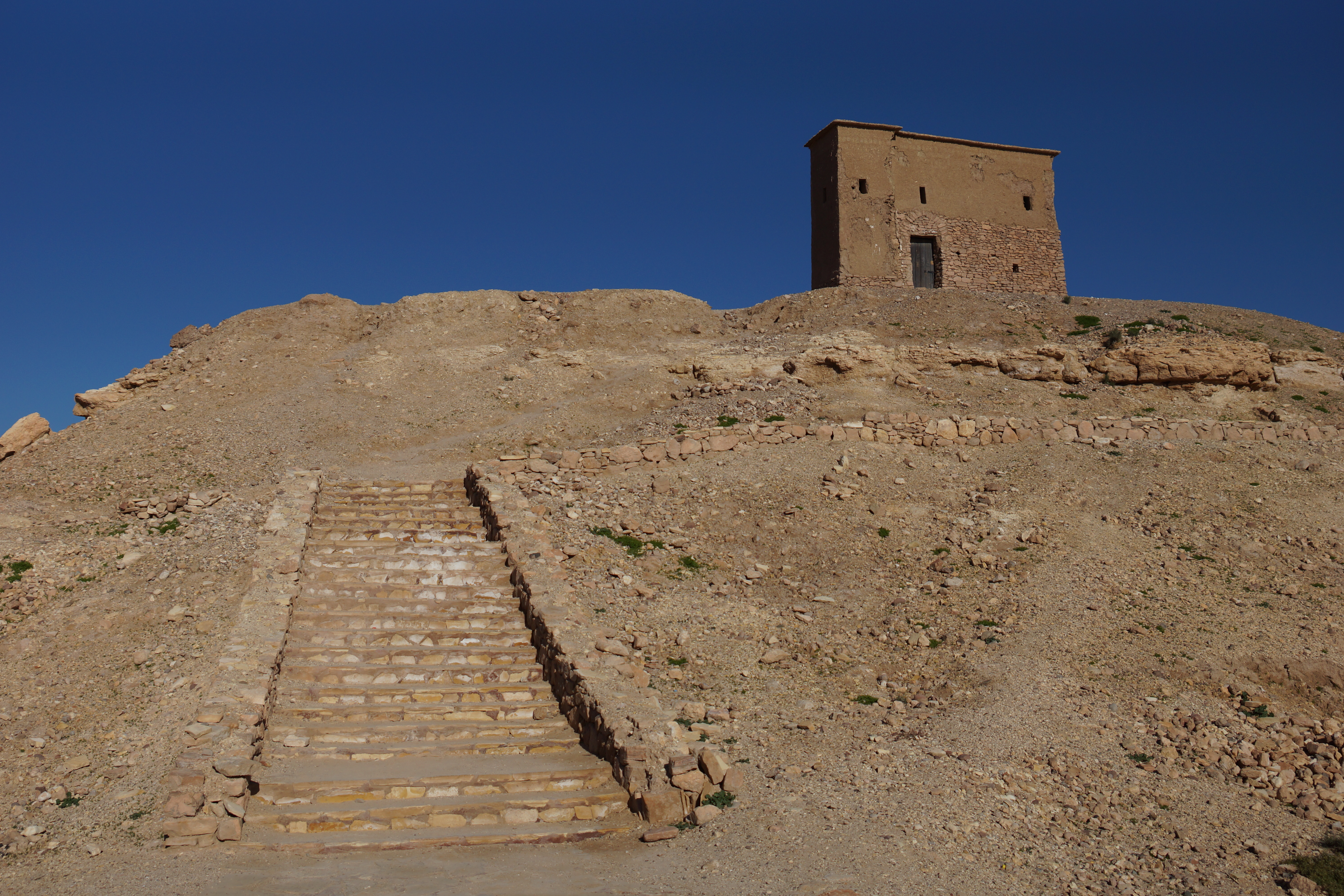
The agadir (granary) at the top of the hill

The ksar is located on the slopes of a hill next to the Ounila River (Asif Ounila). The village's buildings are grouped together within a defensive wall that includes corner towers and a gate. They include dwellings of various size ranging from modest houses to tall structures with towers. Some of the buildings are decorated in their upper parts with geometric motifs. The village also has a number of public or community buildings such as a mosque, a caravanserai, multiple kasbahs (castle-like fortification) and the Marabout of Sidi Ali or Amer. At the top of the hill, overlooking the ksar, are the remains of a large fortified granary (agadir). There is also a public square, a Muslim cemetery, and a Jewish cemetery. Outside the ksar's walls was an area where grain was grown and threshed.

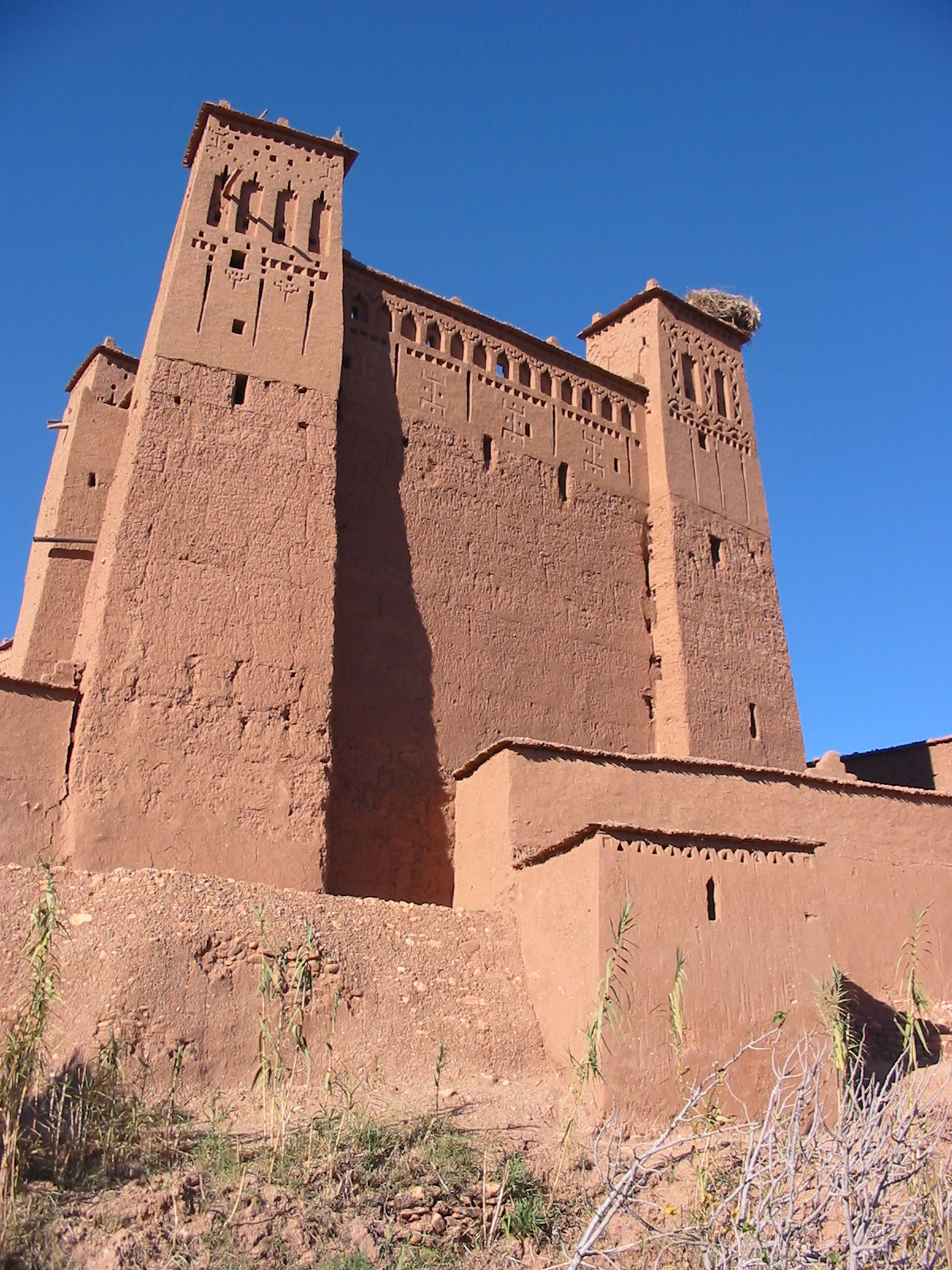
A kasbah (fortified dwelling) in the lower part of the village

=== Building materials ===
The ksar's structures are made entirely out of rammed earth, adobe, clay bricks, and wood. Rammed earth (also known as pisé, tabia, or al-luh) was a highly practical and cost-effective material but required constant maintenance. It was made of compressed earth and mud, usually mixed with other materials to aid adhesion. The structures of Ait Benhaddou and of other kasbahs and ksour throughout this region of Morocco typically employed a mixture of earth and straw, which was relatively permeable and easily eroded by rain over time. As a result, villages of this type can begin to crumble only a few decades after being abandoned. At Ait Benhaddou, taller structures were made of rammed earth up to their first floor while the upper floors were made of lighter adobe so as to reduce the load of the walls.

== Preservation ==
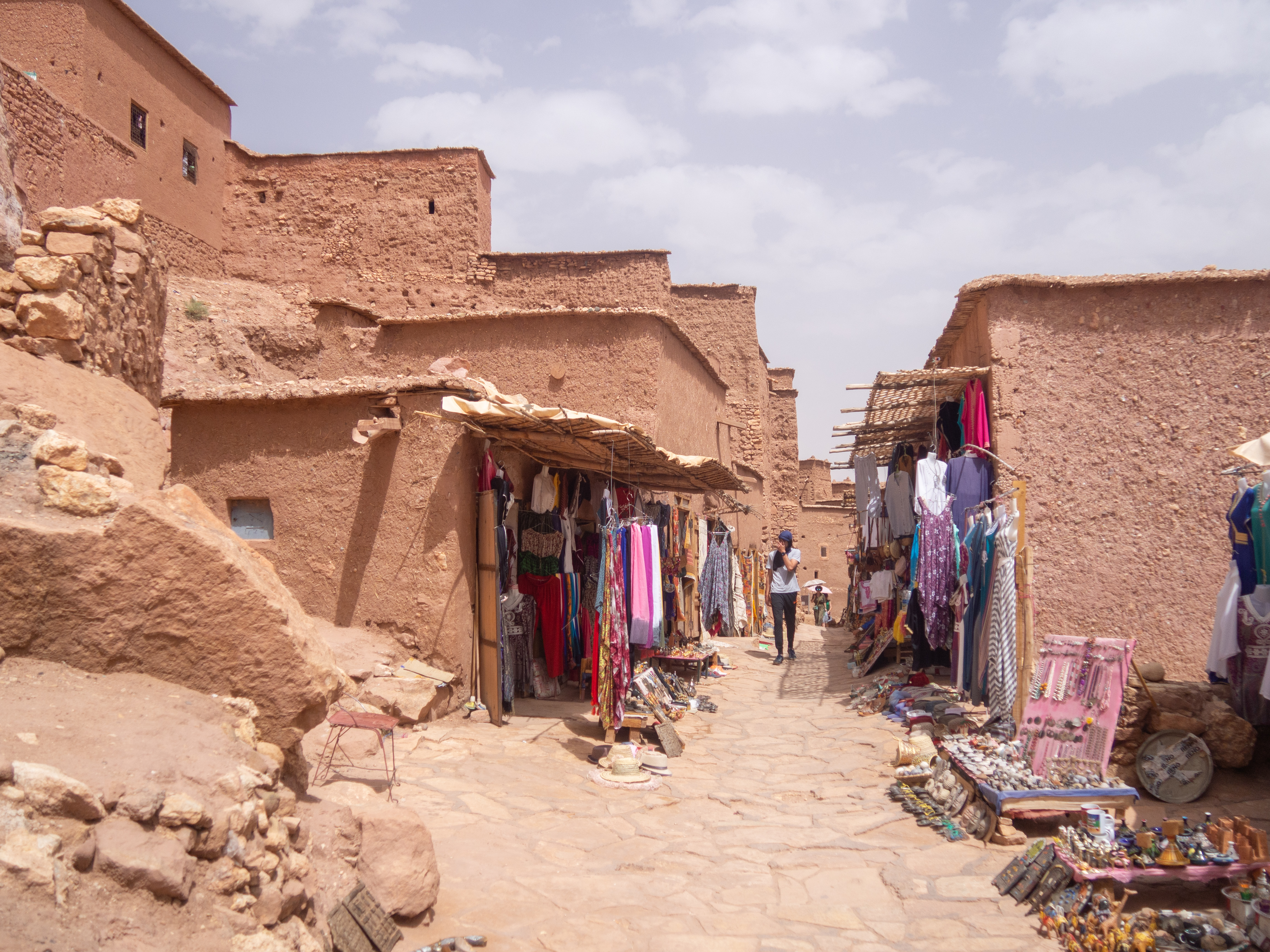
Street stalls inside the old village

The ksar has been significantly restored in modern times, thanks in part to its use as a Hollywood filming location and to its inscription on the UNESCO list of World Heritage Sites in 1987. UNESCO reports that the ksar has "preserved its architectural authenticity with regard to configuration and materials" by continuing to use traditional construction materials and techniques and by largely avoiding new concrete constructions. A local committee is in charge of monitoring and managing the site.

== Films shot at Aït Benhaddou ==
A large number of films shot in Morocco have used Aït Benhaddou as a location, including:

- Lawrence of Arabia (1962)
- Sodom and Gomorrah (1963)
- Oedipus Rex (1967)
- The Man Who Would Be King (1975)
- The Message (1976)
- Jesus of Nazareth (1977)
- Time Bandits (1981)
- Marco Polo (1982)
- The Jewel of the Nile (1985)
- The Living Daylights (1987)
- The Last Temptation of Christ (1988)
- The Sheltering Sky (1990)
- Kundun (1997)
- The Mummy (1999)
- Gladiator (2000)
- Alexander (2004)
- Kingdom of Heaven (2005)
- Babel (2006)
- One Night with the King (2006)
- Prince of Persia (2010)
- Son of God (2014)
- Queen of the Desert (2015)
- A Life on Our Planet (2020)
- The Odyssey (2026)

Aït Benhaddou was also used in parts of the TV series Game of Thrones, the Brazilian TV series O Clone, The Amazing Race Australia 6 and Outer Banks.

== See also ==
- Tourism in Morocco
