= Khouzama =

Khouzama خوزامة
- commune
- Interactive map of Khouzama
- Country: Morocco
- Region: Souss-Massa-Drâa
- Province: Ouarzazate

Population (2004)
  - Total: 8,191
- Time zone: UTC+0 (GMT)

Khouzama is a commune in the Ouarzazate Province of the Souss-Massa-Drâa administrative region of Morocco. At the time of the 2004 census, the commune had a total population of 8191 people living in 1373 households.
