= Angarf =

- Town
- Location within Morocco
- Coordinates: 29°33′N 8°34′W
- Country: Morocco
- Region: Drâa-Tafilalet
- Province: Ouarzazate Province
- Time zone: UTC+0 (GMT)

Angarf or Angaref is a small town in Ouarzazate Province, in the Drâa-Tafilalet region of Morocco. The area is noted for its granite pegmatite.
