= Amerzgane =

Coordinates: 31°03′N 7°13′W

Amerzgane ⴰⵎⵕⵣⴳⴳⴰⵏ أمرزكان
- commune
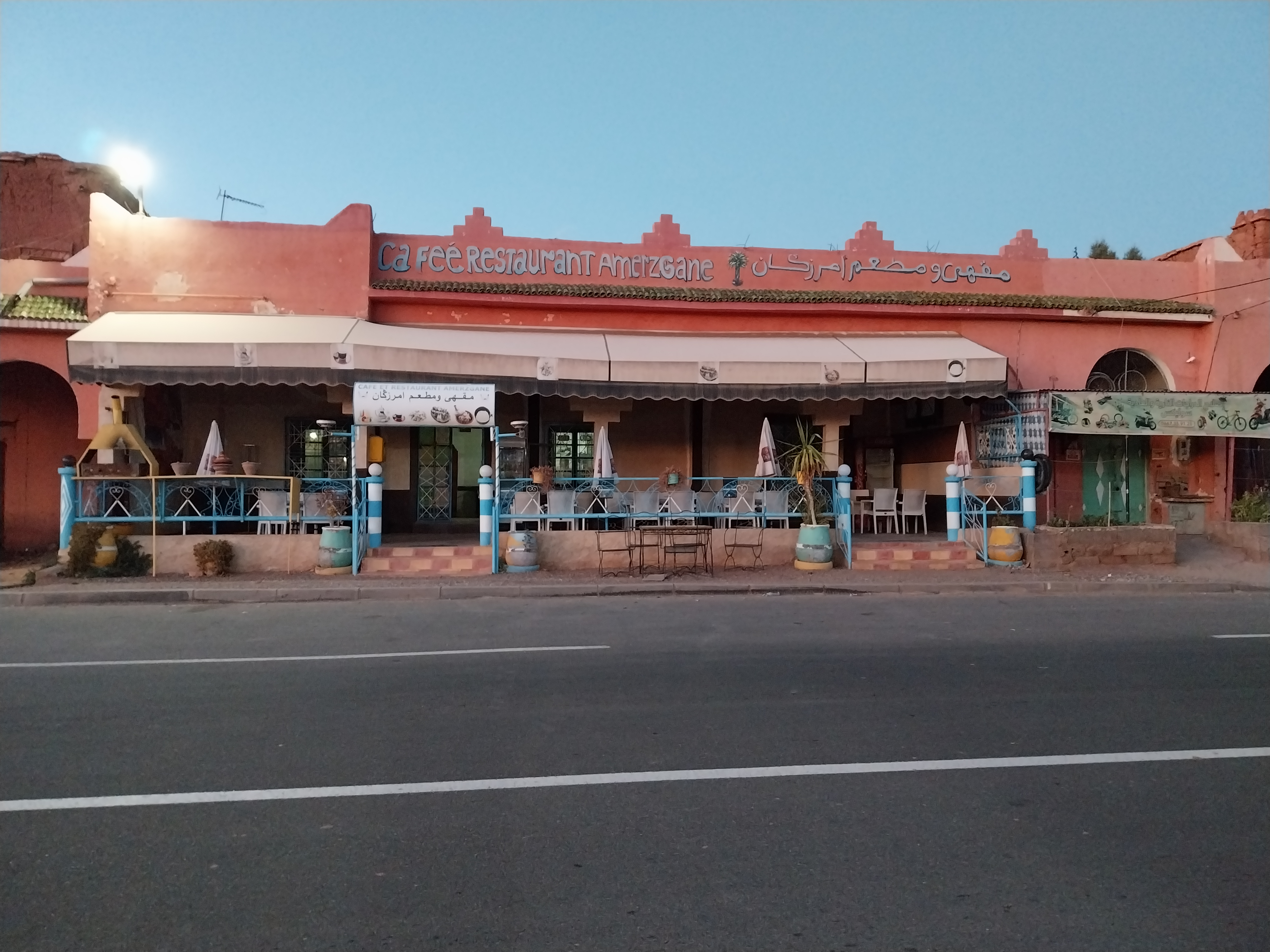
- Interactive map of Amerzgane
- Country: Morocco
- Region: Souss-Massa-Drâa
- Province: Ouarzazate

Population (2014)
  - Total: 8,820
- Time zone: UTC+0 (GMT)

Amerzgane (Tachelhit: ⴰⵎⵕⵣⴳⴳⴰⵏ) (Arabic: أمرزكان) is a commune in the Ouarzazate Province of the Drâa-Tafilalet administrative region of Morocco. At the time of the 2004 census, the commune had a total population of 7,593 people living in 1,290 households. However, these numbers have since grown; in the 2014 Moroccan census, Amerzgane had a total population of 8,820 people across 1,656 households. These numbers are composed almost entirely of native Moroccans, with the 2014 census reporting only one foreign citizen as a part of the population.
