= Idelsane =

- commune
- Interactive map of Idelsane
- Coordinates: 31°00′02″N 6°39′05″W
- Country: Morocco
- Region: Souss-Massa-Drâa
- Province: Ouarzazate

Population (2004)
  - Total: 8,140
- Time zone: UTC+0 (GMT)

Idelsane is a commune in the Ouarzazate Province of the Souss-Massa-Drâa administrative region of Morocco. According to the 2004 census, the commune had a total population of 8140 people living in 1214 households.
