= Imi N'Oulaoune =

Imi N'Oulaoune إمي نولاون
- commune
- Interactive map of Imi N'Oulaoune
- Country: Morocco
- Region: Souss-Massa-Drâa
- Province: Ouarzazate

Population (2004)
  - Total: 19,968
- Time zone: UTC+0 (GMT)

Imi N'Oulaoune is a commune in the Ouarzazate Province of the Souss-Massa-Drâa administrative region of Morocco. At the time of the 2004 census, the commune had a total population of 19968 people living in 2654 households.
