= Tidli =

- commune
- Interactive map of Tidli
- Country: Morocco
- Region: Souss-Massa-Drâa
- Province: Ouarzazate

Population (2004)
  - Total: 14,660
- Time zone: UTC+0 (GMT)

Tidli is a commune in the Ouarzazate Province of the Souss-Massa-Drâa administrative region of Morocco. At the time of the 2004 census, the commune had a total population of 14660 people living in 2169 households.
