= Tarmigt =

- commune
- Interactive map of Tarmigt
- Country: Morocco
- Region: Souss-Massa-Drâa
- Province: Ouarzazate

Population (2004)
  - Total: 30,871
- Time zone: UTC+0 (GMT)

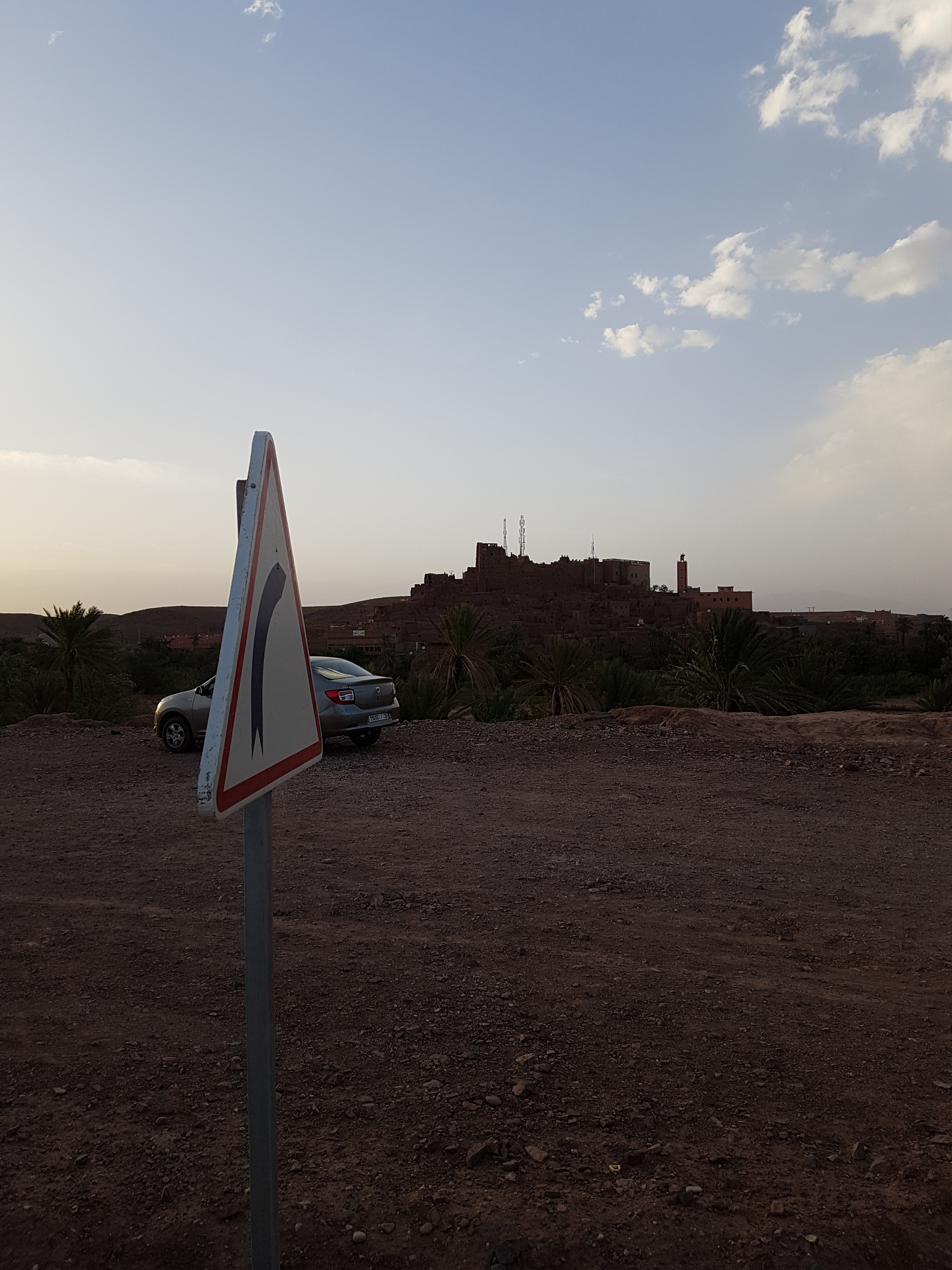
The Kasbah of Tifoultoute, Tarmigt.

Tarmigt is a commune in the Ouarzazate Province of the Souss-Massa-Drâa administrative region of Morocco. At the time of the 2004 census, the commune had a total population of around 40 thousand people living in 5241 households. The Oasis Film Studios are located nearby.
