= Ouisselsate =

- commune
- Interactive map of Ouisselsate
- Country: Morocco
- Region: Souss-Massa-Drâa
- Province: Ouarzazate

Population (2004)
  - Total: 15,361
- Time zone: UTC+0 (GMT)

Ouisselsate is a commune in the Ouarzazate Province of the Souss-Massa-Drâa administrative region of Morocco. At the time of the 2004 census, the commune had a total population of 15361 people living in 2413 households.
