= Siroua =

Coordinates: 30.7269°N 7.3614°W

- commune
- Interactive map of Siroua
- Country: Morocco
- Region: Souss-Massa-Drâa
- Province: Ouarzazate

Population (2004)
  - Total: 9,633
- Time zone: UTC+0 (GMT)

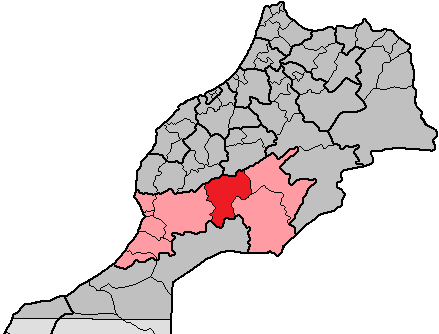
Siroua Commune

Siroua is a commune in the Ouarzazate Province of the Souss-Massa-Drâa administrative region of Morocco. At the time of the 2004 census, the commune had a total population of 9633 people living in 1482 households.
