= Iznaguen =

- commune
- Interactive map of Iznaguen
- Coordinates: 30.421044°N 7.432505°W
- Country: Morocco
- Region: Souss-Massa-Drâa
- Province: Ouarzazate

Population (2004)
  - Total: 1,872
- Time zone: UTC+0 (GMT)

Iznaguen is a commune in the Ouarzazate Province of the Souss-Massa-Drâa administrative region of Morocco. At the time of the 2004 census, the commune had a total population of 1,872 people living in households.
