= Ighrem N'Ougdal =

Coordinates: 31°14′N 7°26′W

Ighrem N'Ougdal ⵉⵖⵔⵎ ⵏ ⵓⴳⴷⴰⵍ إغرم نوكدال
- commune
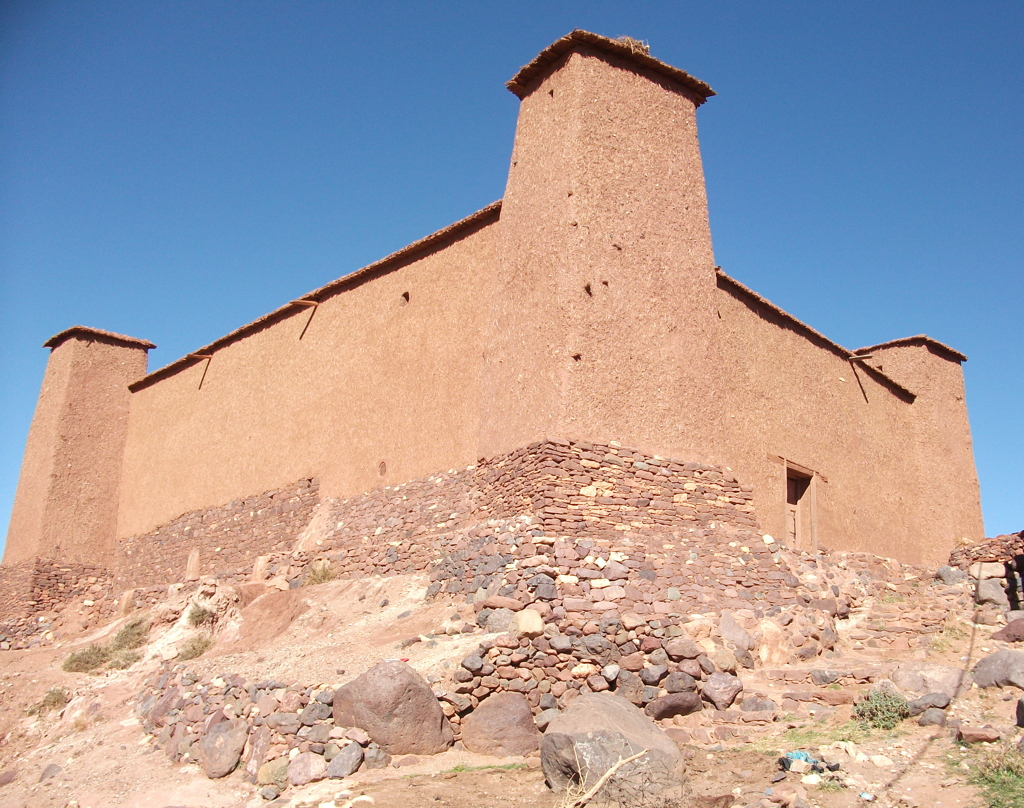
- Agadir-Igherm-n'Ougdal
- Interactive map of Ighrem N'Ougdal
- Country: Morocco
- Region: Drâa-Tafilalet
- Province: Ouarzazate

Population (2004)
  - Total: 14,014
- Time zone: UTC+0 (GMT)

Ighrem N'Ougdal is a commune in the Ouarzazate Province of the Souss-Massa-Drâa administrative region of Morocco. At the time of the 2004 census, the commune had a total population of 14014 people living in 2209 households.
