= Tizi n'Tichka =

Tizi n'Tichka Tizi n Ticka ⵜⵉⵣⵉ ⵏ ⵜⵉⵛⴽⴰ تيزي ن تيشكا
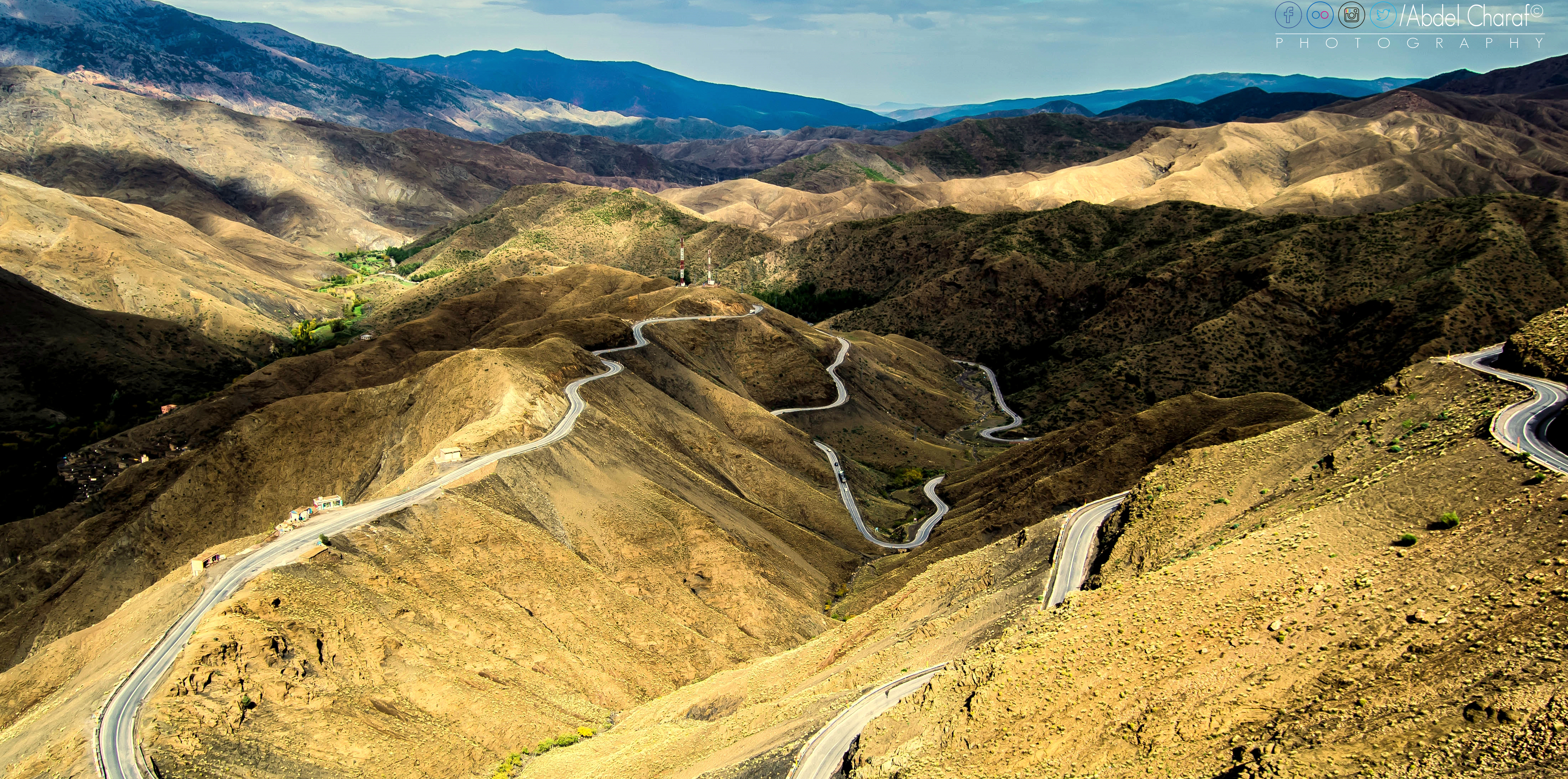

- Location within Morocco
- Elevation: 2,205 m (7,234 ft)

Third Approach
- Location: Morocco
- Range: Atlas Mountains
- Coordinates: 31°17′9″N 7°22′51″W

Tizi n'Tichka (Berber languages: ⵜⵉⵣⵉ ⵏ ⵜⵉⵛⴽⴰ, romanized: Tizi n Ticka; Arabic: تيزي ن تيشكا) is a mountain pass in Morocco, linking the south-east of Marrakesh to the city of Ouarzazate through the High Atlas mountains. It lies above the great Marrakesh plains, and is a gateway to the Sahara.

== Climate and elevation ==
From November through March, snow can often fall on the pass, but it can be warm all year round in the strong sun. It has been believed for a long time that it reaches an elevation of 2,260 metres (7,415 ft) above the sea level (this is also indicated on a sign at the top of the pass), but a gps-measurement by Hans Mülder on 30 November 2022 indicated it is only 2,205 metres (7,234 ft) high, which was confirmed by Google Earth, on which the highest altitude of the pass is 2,207 metres (7,241 ft). It is the highest major mountain pass in North Africa. The road was constructed along the old caravan trail by the French military in 1936, and is now part of National Route 9 (formerly Route P-31).

== Fauna ==
The last known wild Barbary lion in Morocco was shot near Tizi n'Tichka in 1942.

== Gallery ==
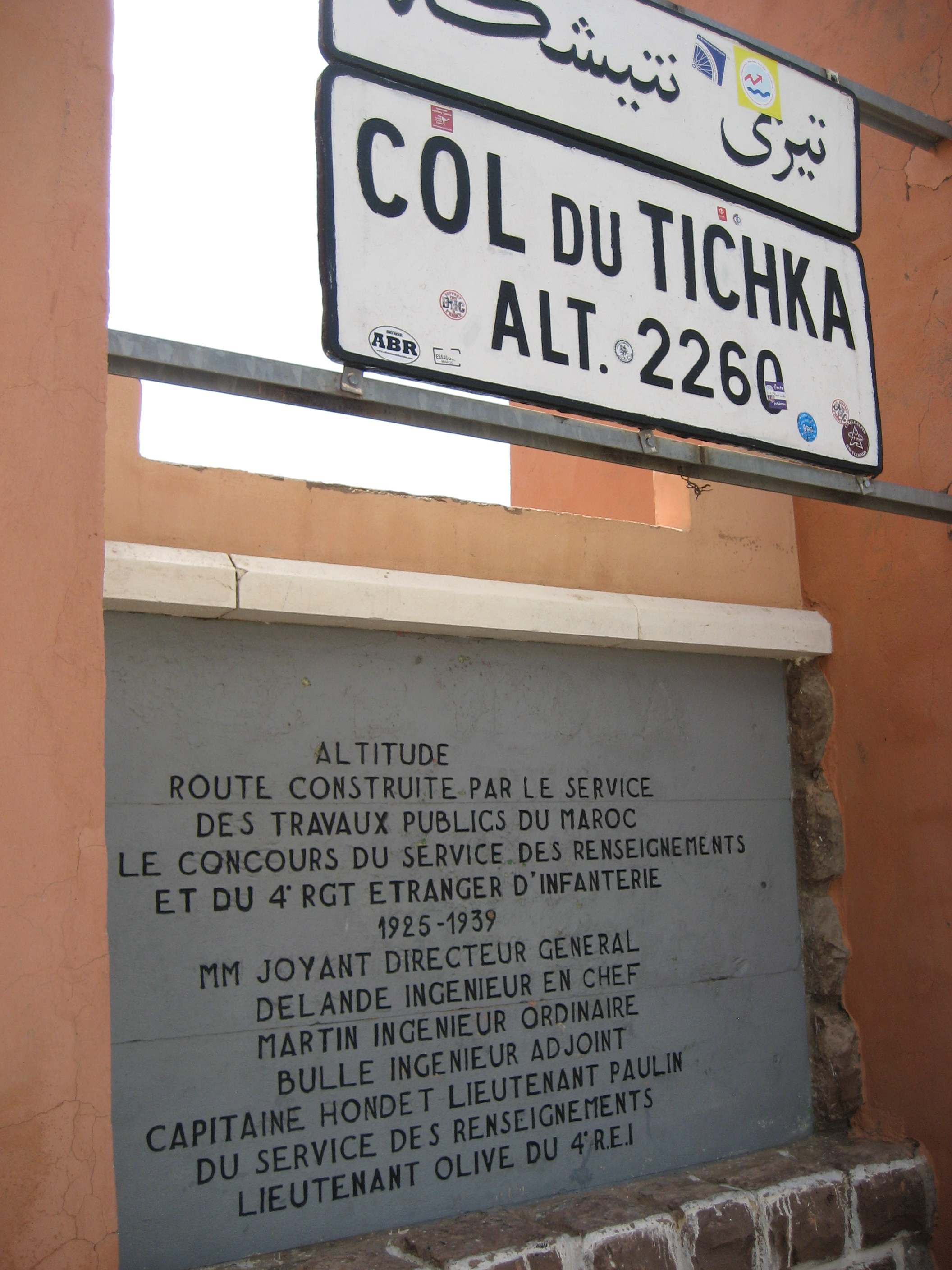
Col du Tichka

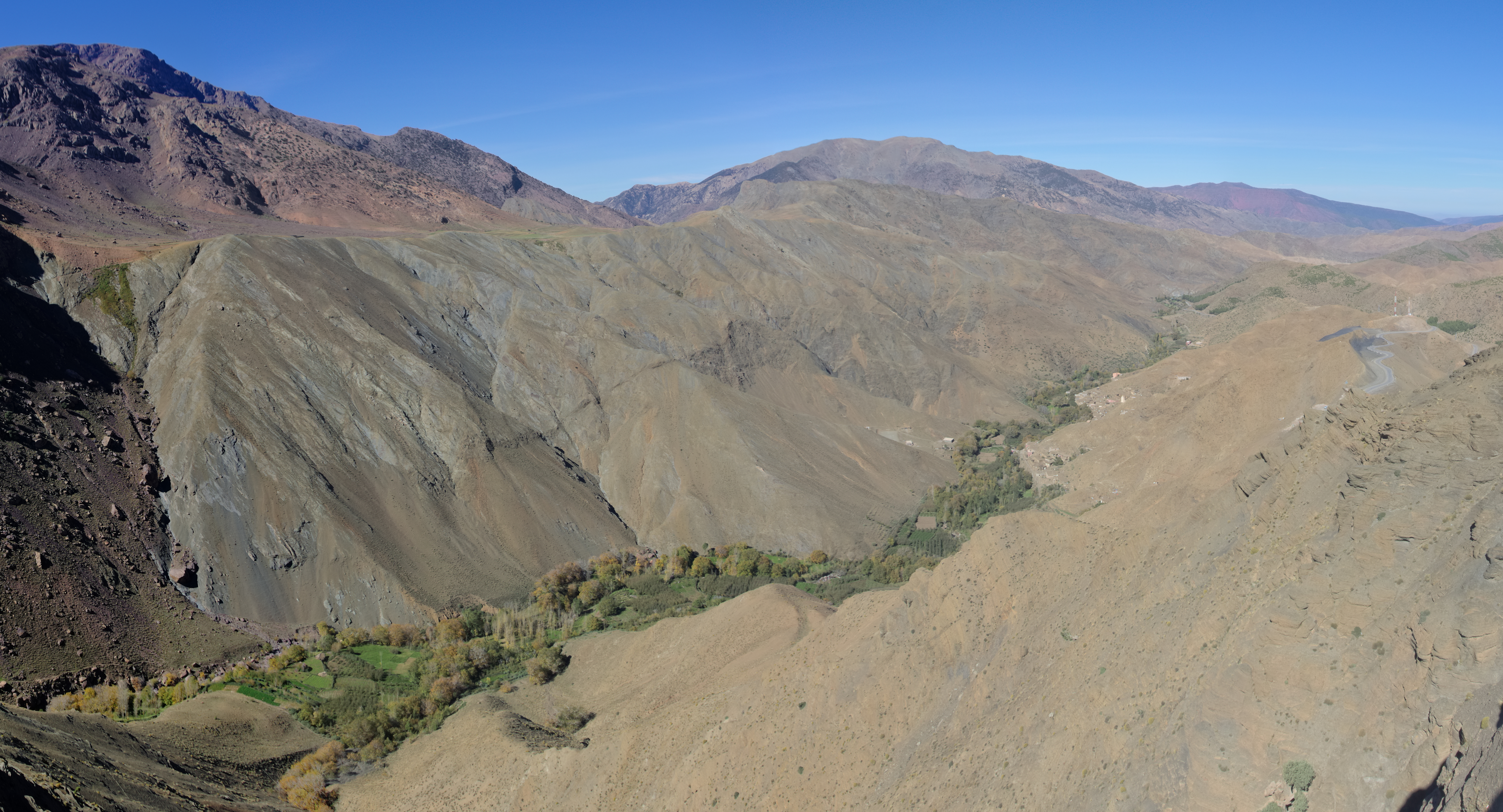

== See also ==
- Maghreb
- Wildlife of Morocco
