= Ouarzazate Province =

Coordinates: 30°59′N 6°54′W

Ouarzazate Province إقليم ورزازات ⵜⴰⵙⴳⴰ ⵏ ⵡⴰⵔⵣⴰⵣⴰⵜ
- Province
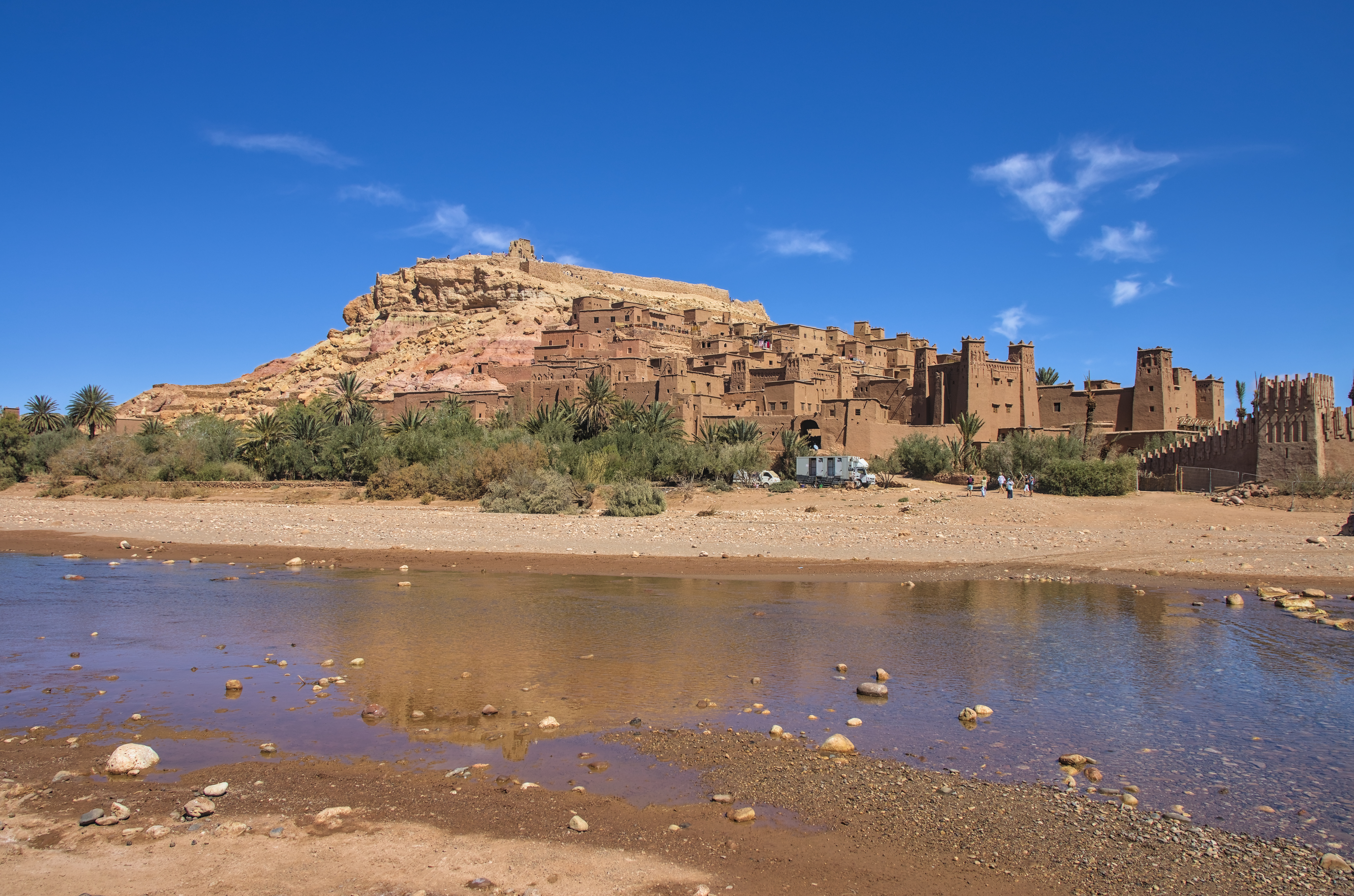
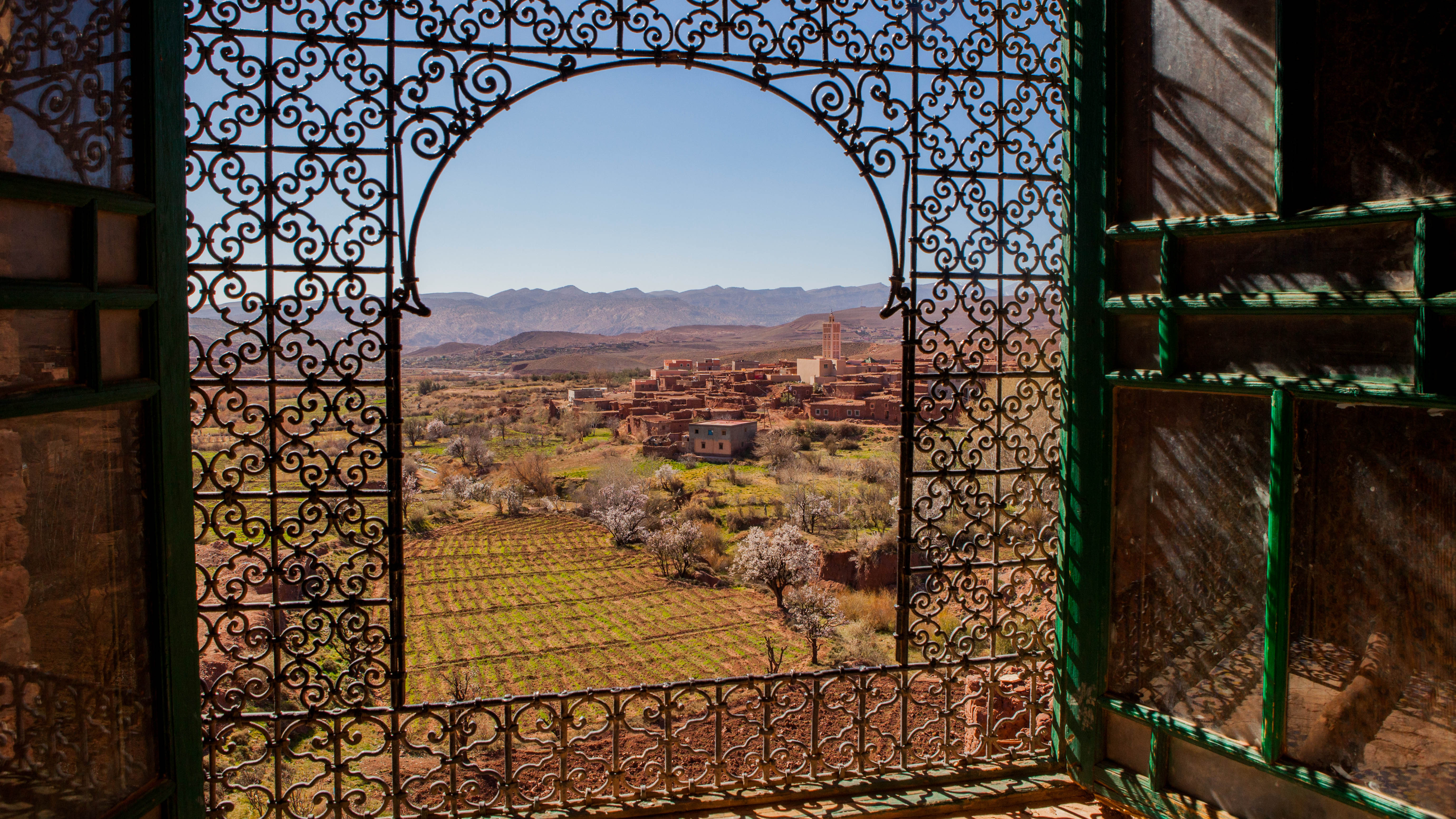
- Aït Benhaddou view from Telouet Kasbah Kasbah Amridil in Skoura

- Flag
- Interactive map of Ouarzazate Province
- Country: Morocco
- Region: Drâa-Tafilalet
- Capital: Ouarzazate

Area
  - Total: 41.550 km^{2} (16.043 sq mi)

Population (2024)
  - Total: 304,932

Ouarzazate Province (Arabic: إقليم ورزازات, romanized: ʾiqlīm Warzāzāt; Standard Moroccan Tamazight: ⵜⴰⵙⴳⴰ ⵏ ⵡⴰⵔⵣⴰⵣⴰⵜ, romanized: tasga n warzazat) is a province in the administrative region of Drâa-Tafilalet, Morocco. Its population in 2024 was 304,932.

The major cities and towns are:

- Ouarzazate
- Skoura
- Tabounte
- Taznakht

== Subdivisions ==
Communes of Ouarzazate Province

The province is divided administratively into the following:

=== Municipalities ===
Name	Geographic code	Households (2024)	Population (2024)
Ouarzazate	401.01.07.	18297	79218
Taznakht	401.01.09.	2010	8268

=== Rural communes ===
Name	Geographic code	Households (2024)	Population (2024)	Notes
Ait Zineb	401.03.01.	2334	10530	
Amerzgane	401.03.03.	1985	8765	
Iznaguen	401.03.05.	2666	11953	
Ghassate	401.07.01.	1431	7169	
Idelsane	401.07.03.	1840	8680	
Ighrem N'Ougdal	401.03.07.	3026	13727	
Imi N'Oulaoune	401.07.05.	3536	19734	
Khouzama	401.03.09.	1672	7401	
Ouisselsate	401.03.11.	2884	12471	
Siroua	401.03.13.	2030	8586	
Skoura Ahl El Oust	401.07.07.	4879	24053	Urban centre: Skoura (4,576 inhabitants; 1,087 households)
Tarmigt	401.07.09.	10058	46963	Urban centre: Tabounte (37,465 inhabitants; 7,902 households)
Telouet	401.03.15.	2655	12396	
Tidli	401.03.17.	3089	14841	
Toundoute	401.07.11.	2028	10177	
