= Ait Zineb =

Ait Zineb ⴰⵢⵜ ⵣⵉⵏⴱ أيت زينب
- commune
- Interactive map of Ait Zineb
- Coordinates: 30°59′20″N 7°08′05″W
- Country: Morocco
- Region: Souss-Massa-Drâa
- Province: Ouarzazate

Population (2004)
  - Total: 9,233
- Time zone: UTC+0 (GMT)

Ait Zineb (Standard Moroccan Tamazight: ⴰⵢⵜ ⵣⵉⵏⴱ) (Arabic: أيت زينب) is a commune in the Ouarzazate Province of the Souss-Massa-Drâa administrative region of Morocco. At the time of the 2004 census, the commune had a total population of 9233 people living in 1518 households.
