= Meknes =

Meknes مكناس (Arabic) ⵎⴽⵏⴰⵙ (Standard Moroccan Tamazight)
- City
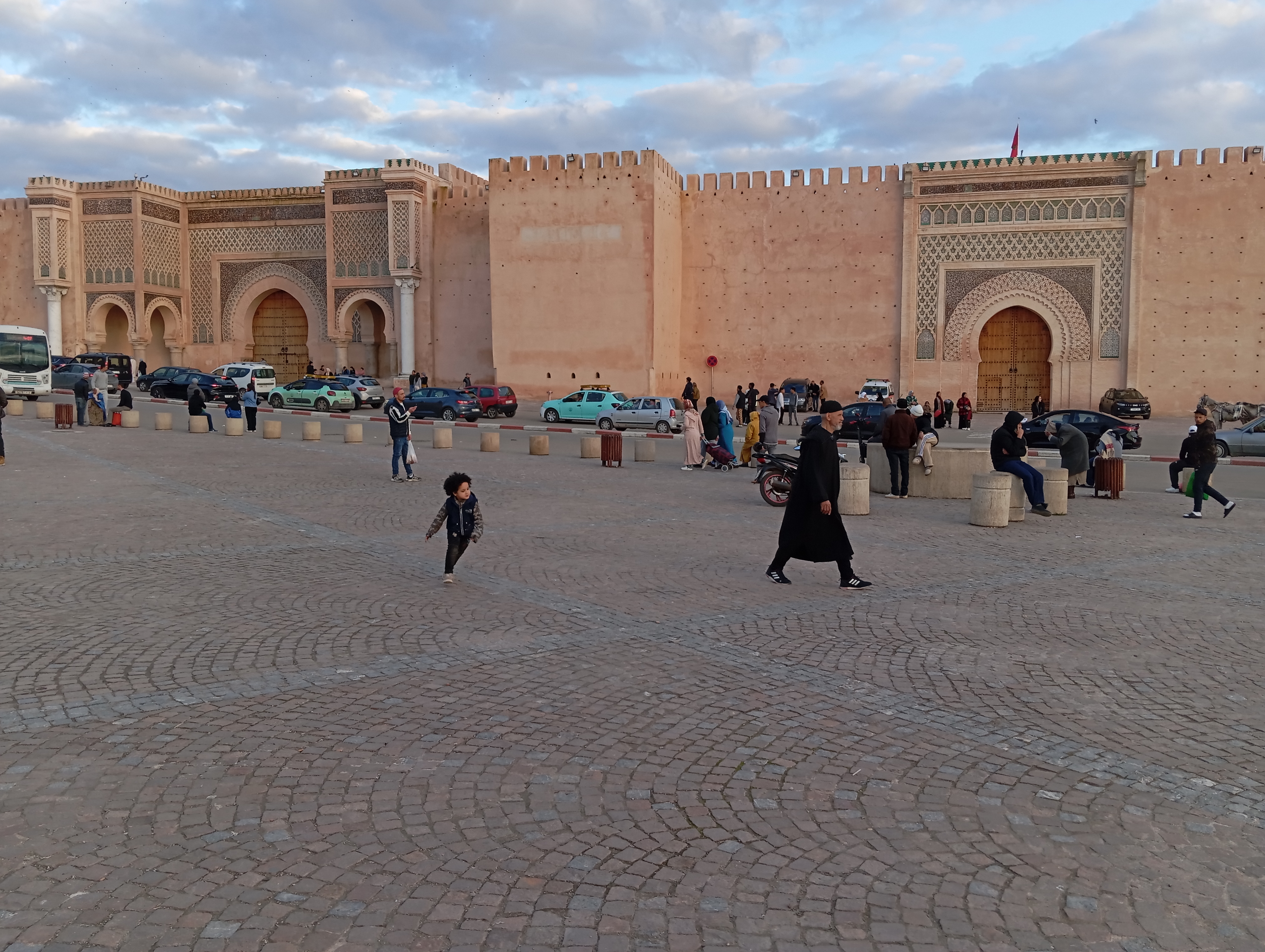

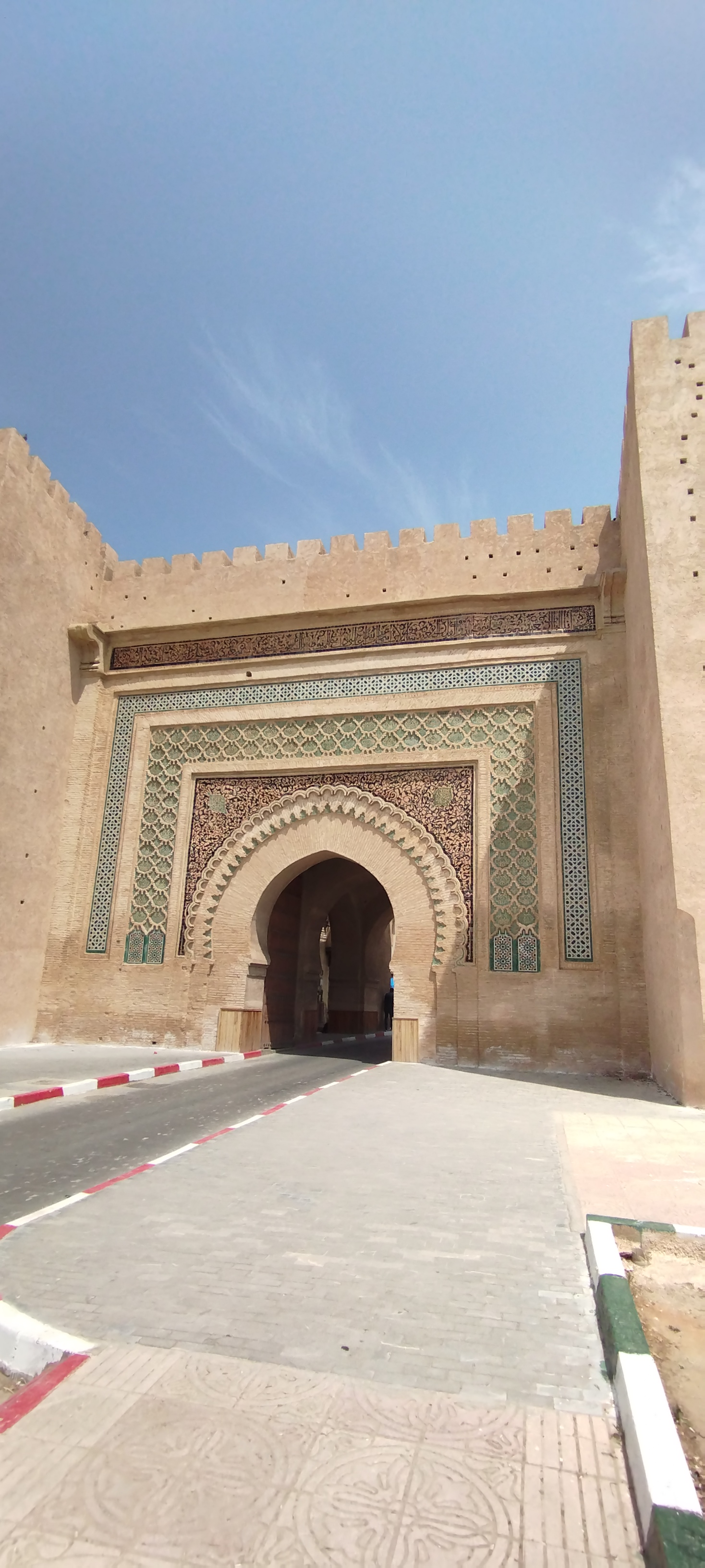

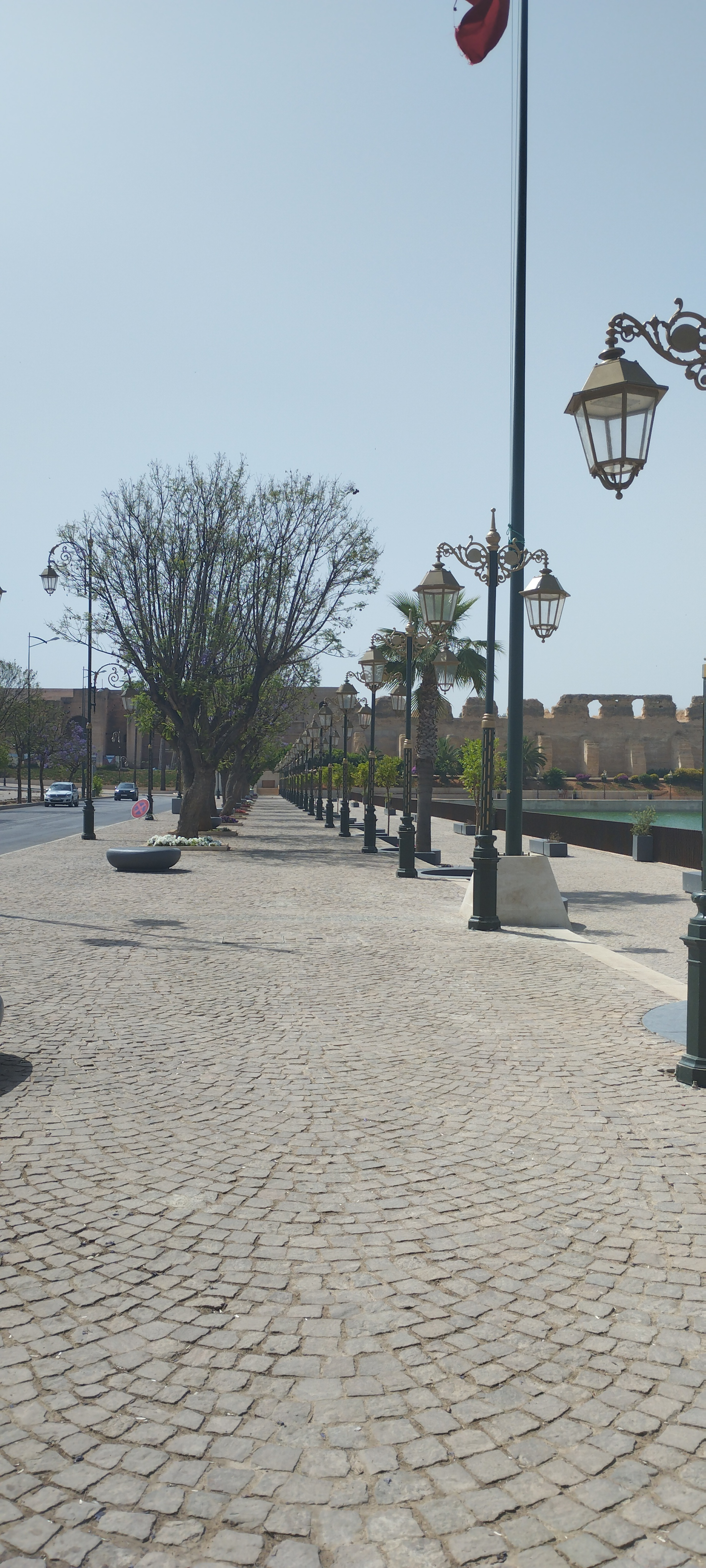

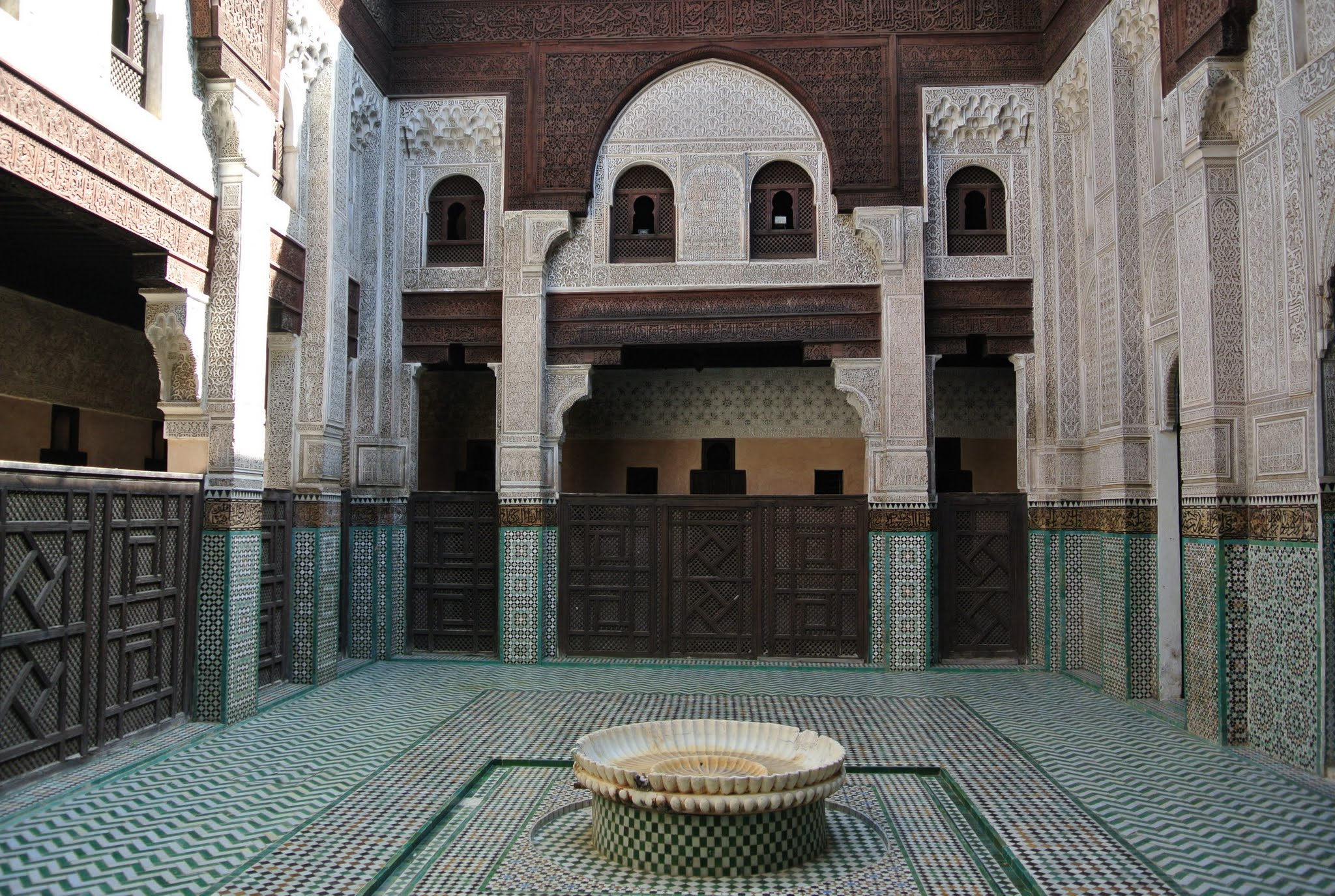

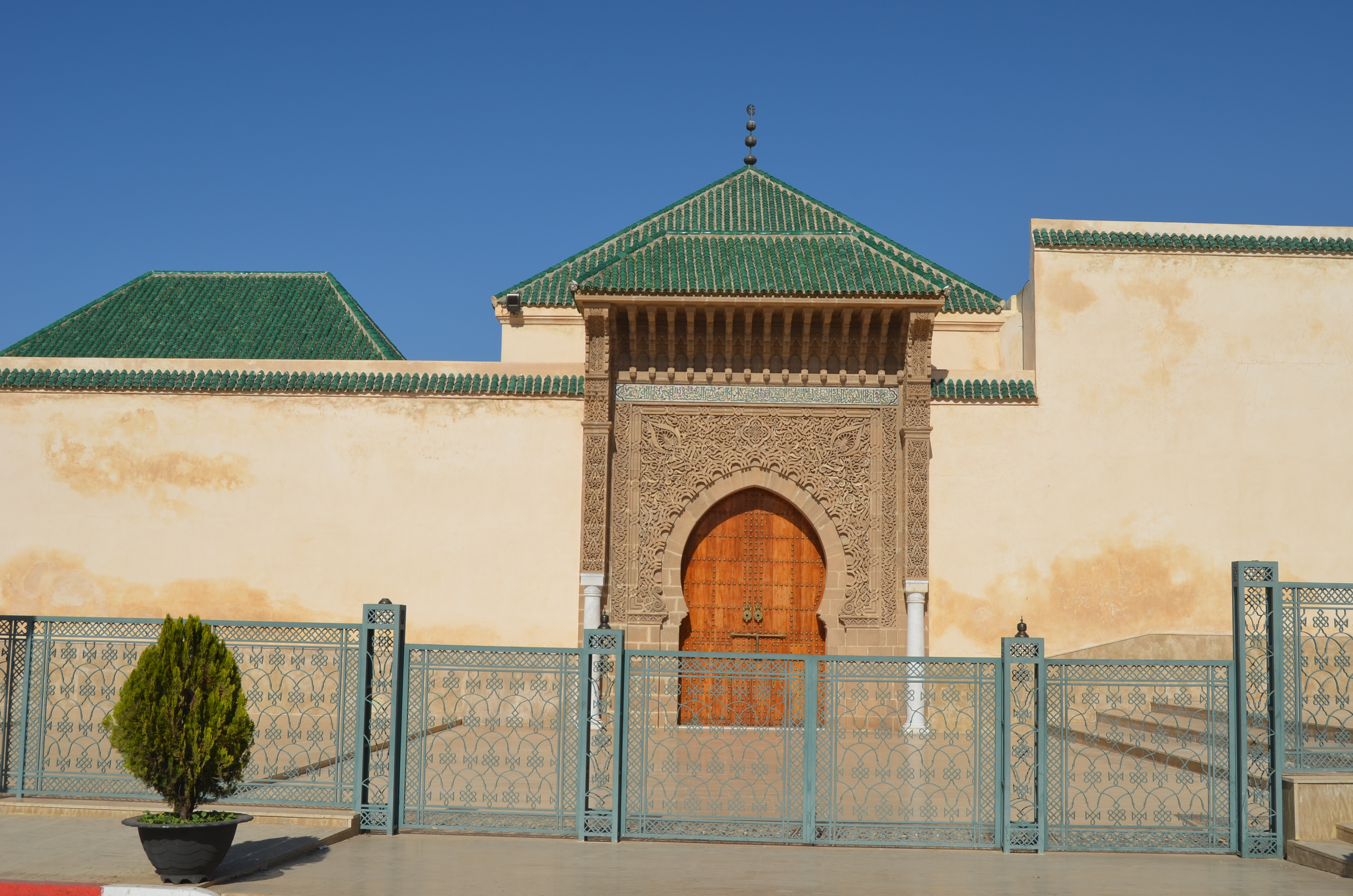
Clockwise from top: Place el-Hedim and Bab Mansour, Sahrij es-Swani, Mausoleum of Moulay Ismail, Bou Inania Madrasa, Bab el-Khemis
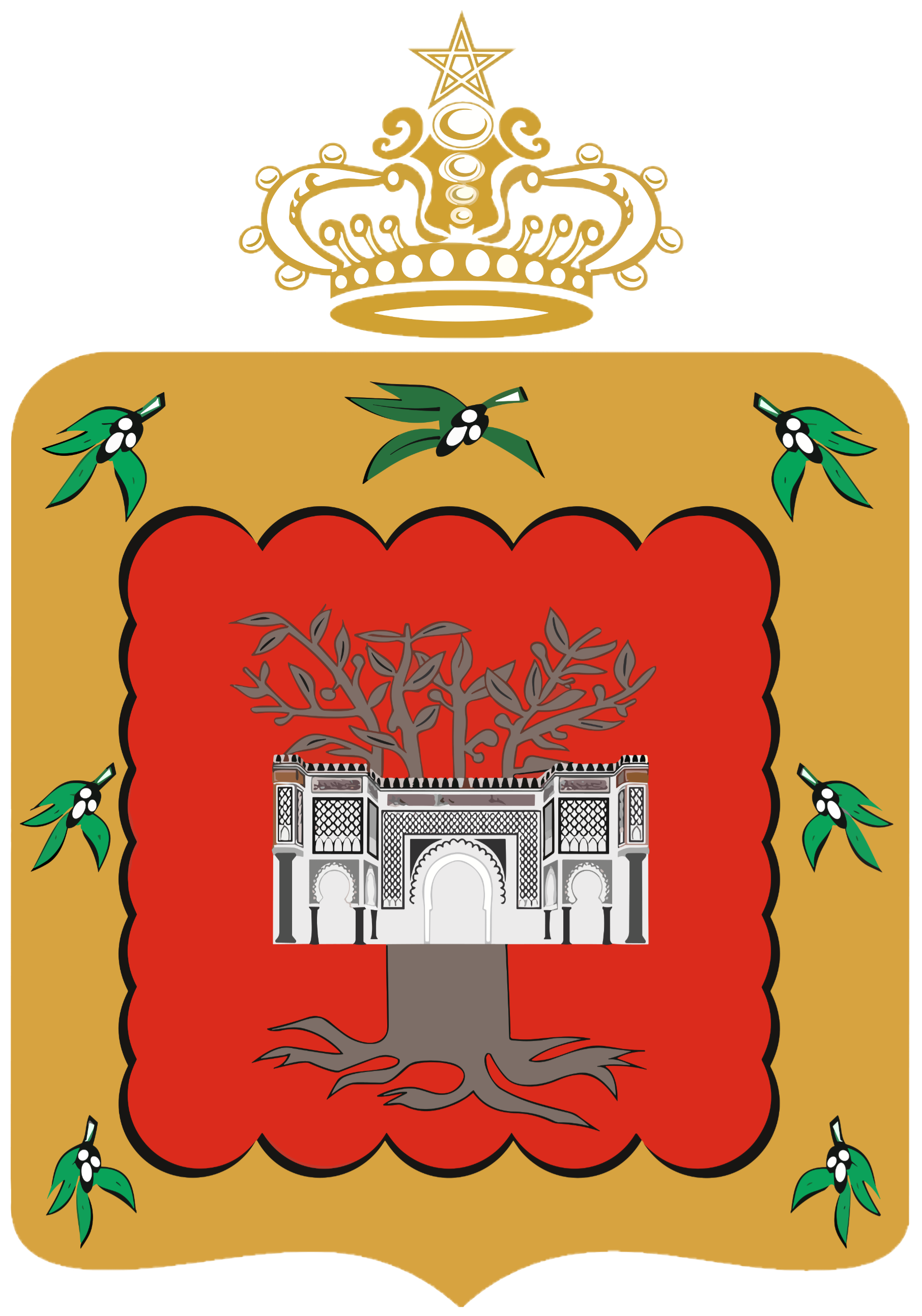
- Seal
- Interactive map of Meknes
- Coordinates: 33°53′42″N 5°33′17″W
- Country: Morocco
- Region: Fez-Meknes
- Prefecture: Meknes

Government
  - Mayor: Abbas Mghari (UC)
  - Prefect: Abdelghani Sebbar

Area
  - Total: 370 km^{2} (140 sq mi)
- Elevation: 546 m (1,791 ft)

Population (2024)
  - Total: 695,662
  - Rank: 6th in Morocco
  - Density: 1,900/km^{2} (4,900/sq mi)
- (Note: In the 2024 census, the High Commission for Planning gave the legal population of Meknes as 695,662. which corresponds to the combined population of the municipalities of Meknes, Al Machouar – Stinia, Toulal and Ouislane.)
- Time zone: UTC+0 (GMT)
- Postal code: 50000
- Website: www.meknes.ma
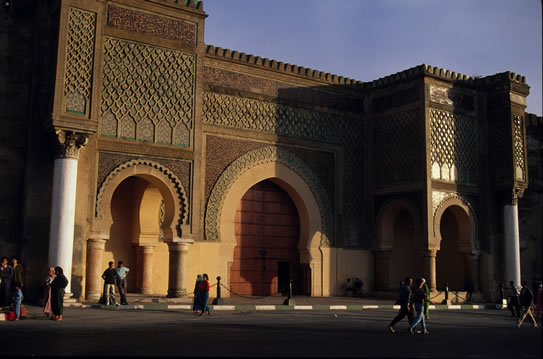

UNESCO World Heritage Site
- Criteria: Cultural: iv
- Reference: 793
- Inscription: 1996 (20th Session)

Meknes (Note: Arabic: مكناس, romanized: maknās, pronounced [maknaːs] Standard Moroccan Tamazight: ⵎⴽⵏⴰⵙ, romanized: mknas) is one of the four imperial cities of Morocco, located in northern central Morocco and the sixth largest city by population in the kingdom. Founded in the 11th century by the Almoravids as a military settlement, Meknes became the capital of Morocco during the reign of Sultan Ismail Ibn Sharif (1672–1727), son of the founder of the Alaouite dynasty. Sultan Ismail created a massive imperial palace complex and endowed the city with extensive fortifications and monumental gates.

The city recorded a population of 695,662 in the 2024 Moroccan census. (Note: In the 2024 census, the High Commission for Planning gave the legal population of Meknes as 695,662 which corresponds to the combined population of the municipalities of Meknes, Al Machouar – Stinia, Toulal and Ouislane.) It is the seat of Meknes Prefecture and an important economic hub in the region of Fez-Meknes.

== Etymology ==
Meknes is named after an Amazigh (Berber) tribe historically known as the Miknasa (Imeknasen in Amazigh languages).

The tribal name Imeknasen (singular: Amaknas or Amknas) derives from the Berber triconsonantal root KNS, which means "to fight", "to contend", or "to quarrel". Formed with the agent noun prefix m-, the word literally translates to "fighters", "warriors", or "combattants". in modern Standard Moroccan Tamazight, the agent noun ⴰⵎⴽⵏⴰⵙ (amknas) has evolved semantically to mean "stubborn" or "headstrong".

== History ==
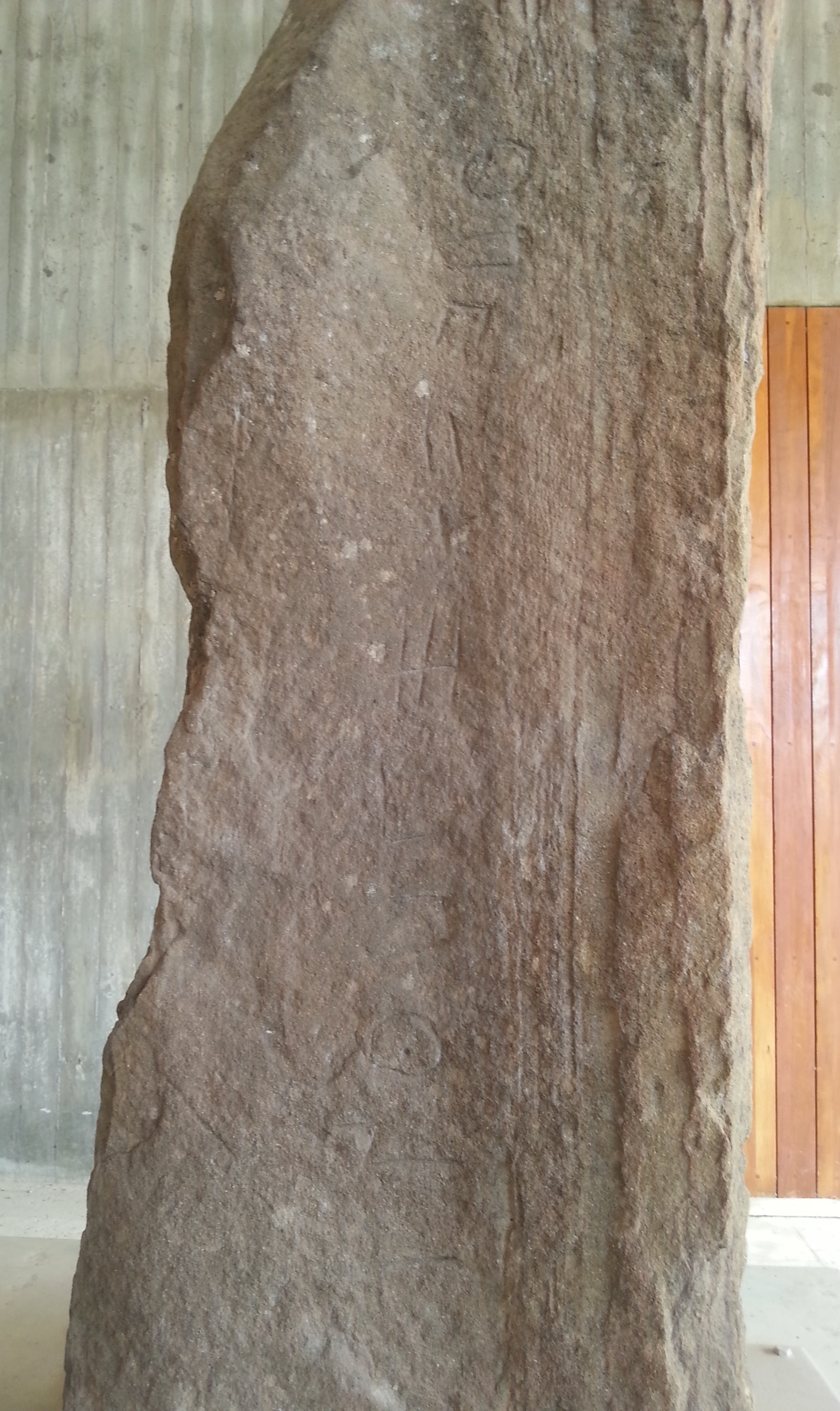
Funerary stele bearing a Libyan inscription. Meknes region.

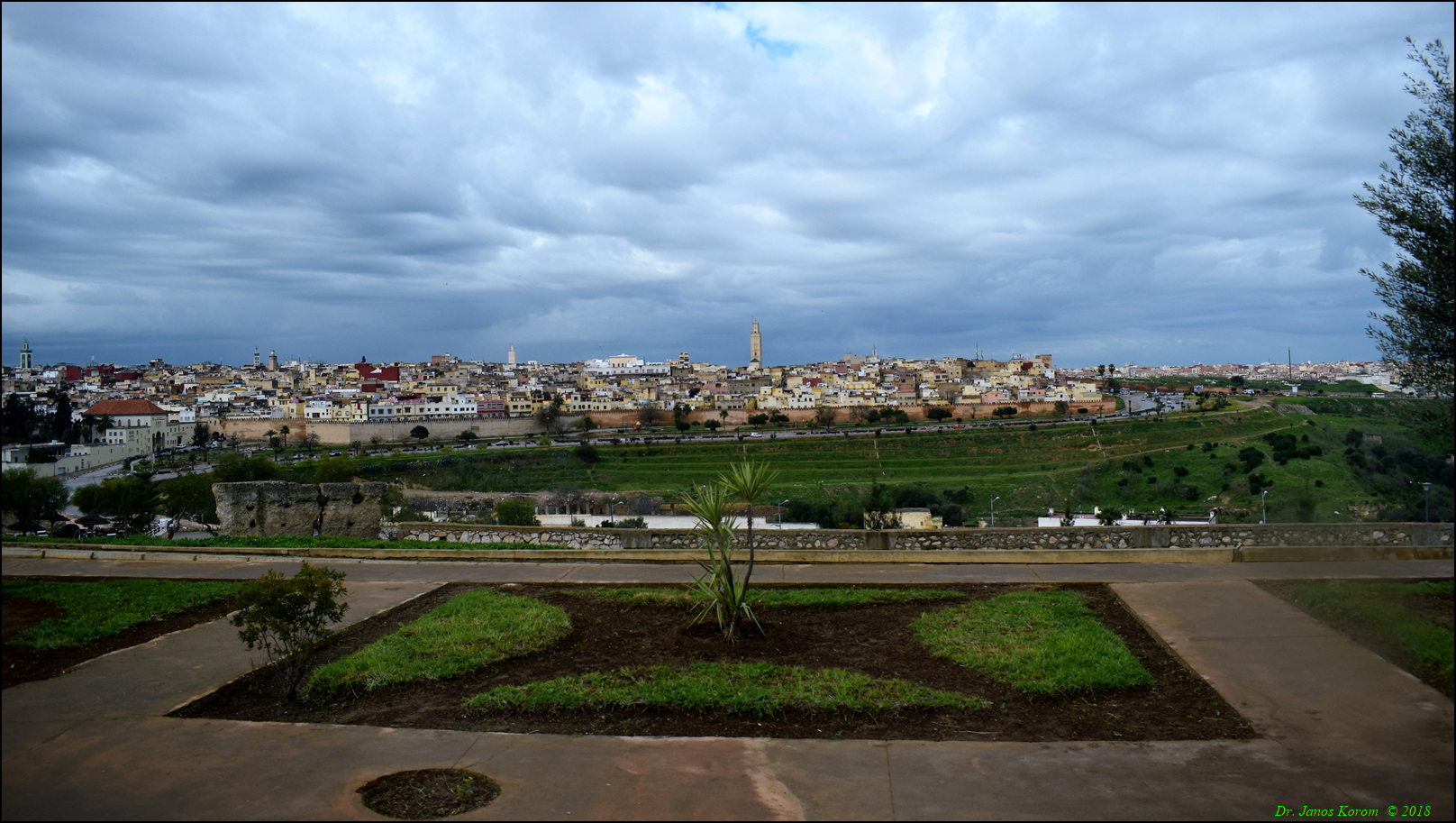
Skyline of the old city (medina) of Meknes

=== Early history (8th–16th centuries) ===
Volubilis, a major Roman-era settlement in Morocco and one of its early urban centres, is located near the site of the current city of Meknes. The current city and its name, however, originate with a Berber tribe called the Miknasa who settled this region around the 10th century. A group of small unfortified Miknasa villages known as miknāsat al-zaytūn were established here in the 10th century. The Almoravids founded a fortress or fortified settlement just south of these villages after conquering the area in the 11th century. Originally called Tagrart or Taqrart, this Almoravid settlement formed the beginnings of what is now the old medina of Meknes. The Nejjarine Mosque, often reputed to be the oldest mosque in the city, dates back to the Almoravid period and may have served as the central mosque of the Almoravid settlement. The mosque that became the present-day Grand Mosque of Meknes is believed to have been first built by the Almoravids in the 12th century.

The fortress resisted the military advance of the Almohads, who destroyed the city after a long siege in the 12th century. However, at the beginning of the 13th century the Almohad caliph Muhammad al-Nasir (ruled 1199–1213) rebuilt the city and its fortifications, as well as its Grand Mosque. The city enjoyed relative prosperity in this period, before being conquered again by the new Marinid dynasty in 1244. The first kasbah (citadel or governor's district) of Meknes was created afterwards by sultan Abu Yusuf Ya'qub in 1276 CE – the same year that the citadel of Fes el-Jdid was built in nearby Fes, the new capital. During this period, Meknes was frequently the residence of Marinid princes (often appointed there as governors) and especially of viziers. The Mosque of the Kasbah (the later Mosque of Lalla Aouda) was also founded and first built in 1276. The Marinids also carried out major restorations to the Grand Mosque in the 14th century and built the major madrasas of the city near it. The latter included the Bou Inania Madrasa (built in 1336) and two other madrasas, Madrasa al-Qadi and Madrasa Shuhud, all built by Sultan Abu el-Hassan.

After the end of the Marinid and Wattasid periods, however, Meknes suffered from neglect as the new Saadian dynasty (16th and early 17th century) focused their attention on their capital at Marrakesh and neglected the old northern cities of Morocco.

=== The reign of Moulay Isma'il (17th–18th centuries) ===
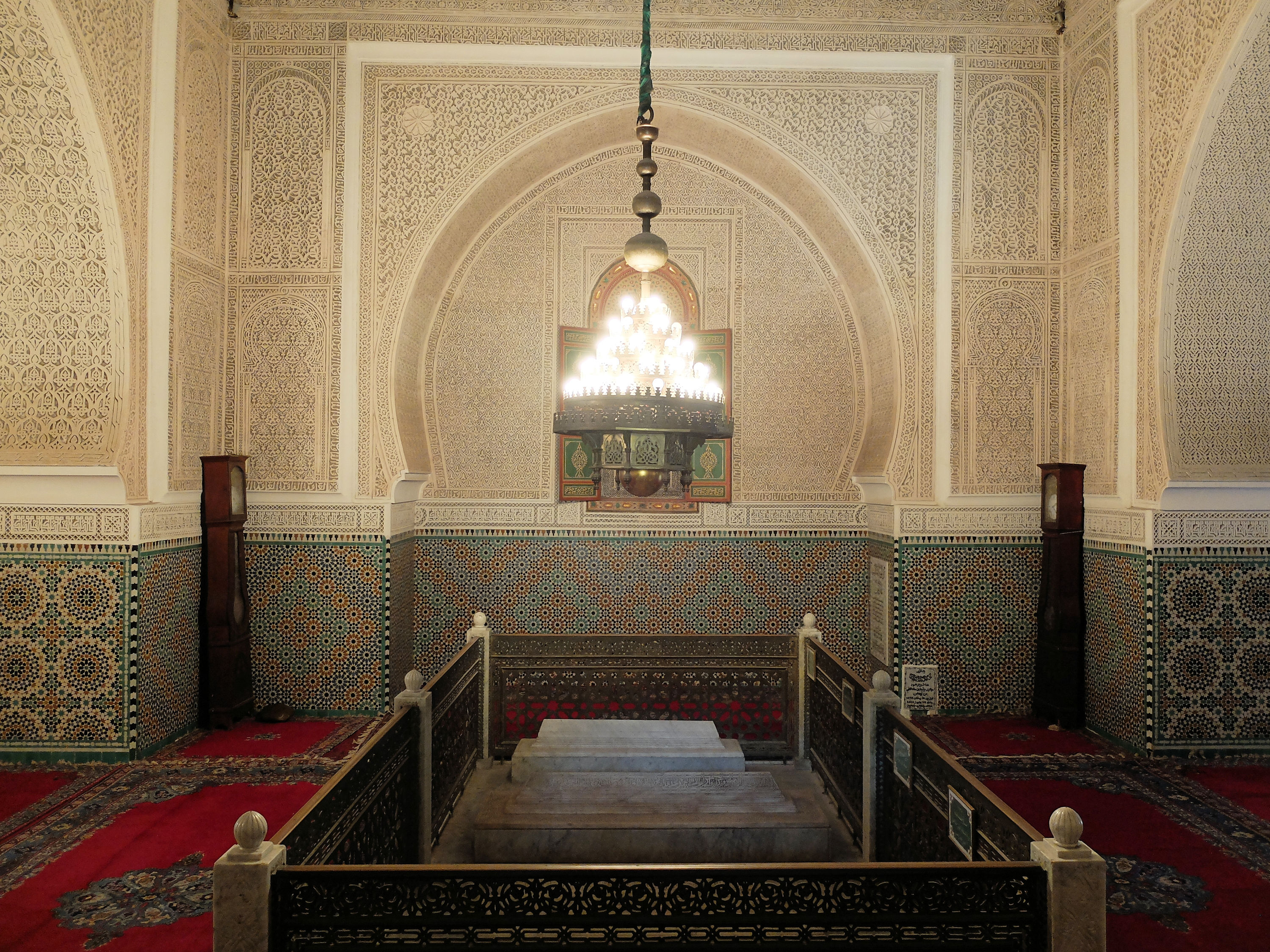
The Mausoleum of Moulay Isma'il

It wasn't until the Alaouite dynasty in the second half of the 17th century that Meknes received renewed attention. Under Moulay Rashid (ruled 1666–1672), the first Alaouite sultan to unite Morocco under his rule, Fes became the capital once more and his brother, Moulay Isma'il ibn Sharif, governed Meknes. Upon Rashid's death in 1672, Moulay Isma'il became sultan and chose Meknes as his new capital. In addition to his possible attachment to the city as a governor, a number of reasons may have favoured this choice. One may have been the fact that Ismail had to fight hard to reconquer both Fes and Marrakesh from his rival nephew (Ahmad al-Mahriz, son of Moulay Rashid) during the first years of his reign, which may have rendered him skeptical towards both cities as possible centers of power. Moreover, Moulay Rashid had garrisoned much of Fes with his own contingents from the Tafilalt and eastern Morocco while Moulay Isma'il was forming his own personal royal guard composed of Black slaves ('abid) from Sub-Saharan Africa, and there may have been concerns that not all these contingents could be garrisoned simultaneously in Fes. The ulema (religious scholars) of Fes were also particularly disapproving of his ways, including his use of slaves (many of whom were of Muslim background), and maintained tense relations with him throughout his reign. Choosing Meknes thus removed him from the influence of traditional elites and allowed him to build a fresh base from which he hoped to exercise absolute power. The threat of Ottoman attacks from the east (from Algeria) and the increasing insecurity in central Morocco due to tribal migrations from the Atlas and Sahara regions may have also persuaded Ismail that Meknes, situated further west, was more defensible than Fes.

Whatever the reasons, Ismail made Meknes the center of Morocco in his time and he embarked on the construction of a new monumental palace-city on the south side of the old city. Its construction continued throughout the 55 years of his reign, beginning immediately after his accession to the throne in 1672. Existing structures dating from the earlier medieval kasbah of the city were demolished to make way; the name of the large public square in front of the Kasbah today, el-Hedim (or Place el-Hedim), means "the rubble" and came from the masses of rubble and debris which were piled here during the demolition. Labour was carried out by paid workers as well as by contingents of slaves, particularly Christian prisoners of war. Estimates on the total number of workers involved range from 25,000 and 55,000. Nonetheless, frequently-told stories about the tens of thousands of Christian slaves used for labour and the large underground dungeons where they were kept are somewhat exaggerated and originate from the accounts of European ambassadors who visited Isma'il's court (often to negotiate the release of prisoners from their countries). In reality, the number of Christian slaves was likely closer to a few thousand at most and the chambers popularly called "prisons" were actually storage rooms for grain and supplies.

It was also in Moulay Ismail's reign that the Jewish inhabitants of the city were moved to a new Mellah or Jewish district to the west, near the Kasbah, not unlike the Mellah of Fes or that of Marrakesh. The Mellah was located between the old medina, west of Place el-Hedim, and the more outlying quarter of Madinat al-Riyad al-Anbari. Both the Mellah and Madinat ar-Riyad were part of an urban extension ordered by Isma'il in the western angle between the old city and the Kasbah. Moulay Isma'il also undertook works throughout the old city too. He refortified the walls and built new monumental city gates such as Bab Berda'in and Bab Khemis. He also built several other kasbahs or garrison forts throughout the city to house his 'abid troops and help protect (and control) the rest of the town, such as the Kasbah Hadrash and the Kasbah Tizimi. He carried out renovations to the Grand Mosque and the nearby Madrasa al-Qadi (which he devotes to students from the Tafilalt), and founded the Zitouna Mosque. Khnata bent Bakkar, one of his wives who was vizier (minister) under him (and briefly became de facto ruler of Morocco in 1728 after his death), was responsible for founding the Bab Berda'in Mosque, completed in 1709.

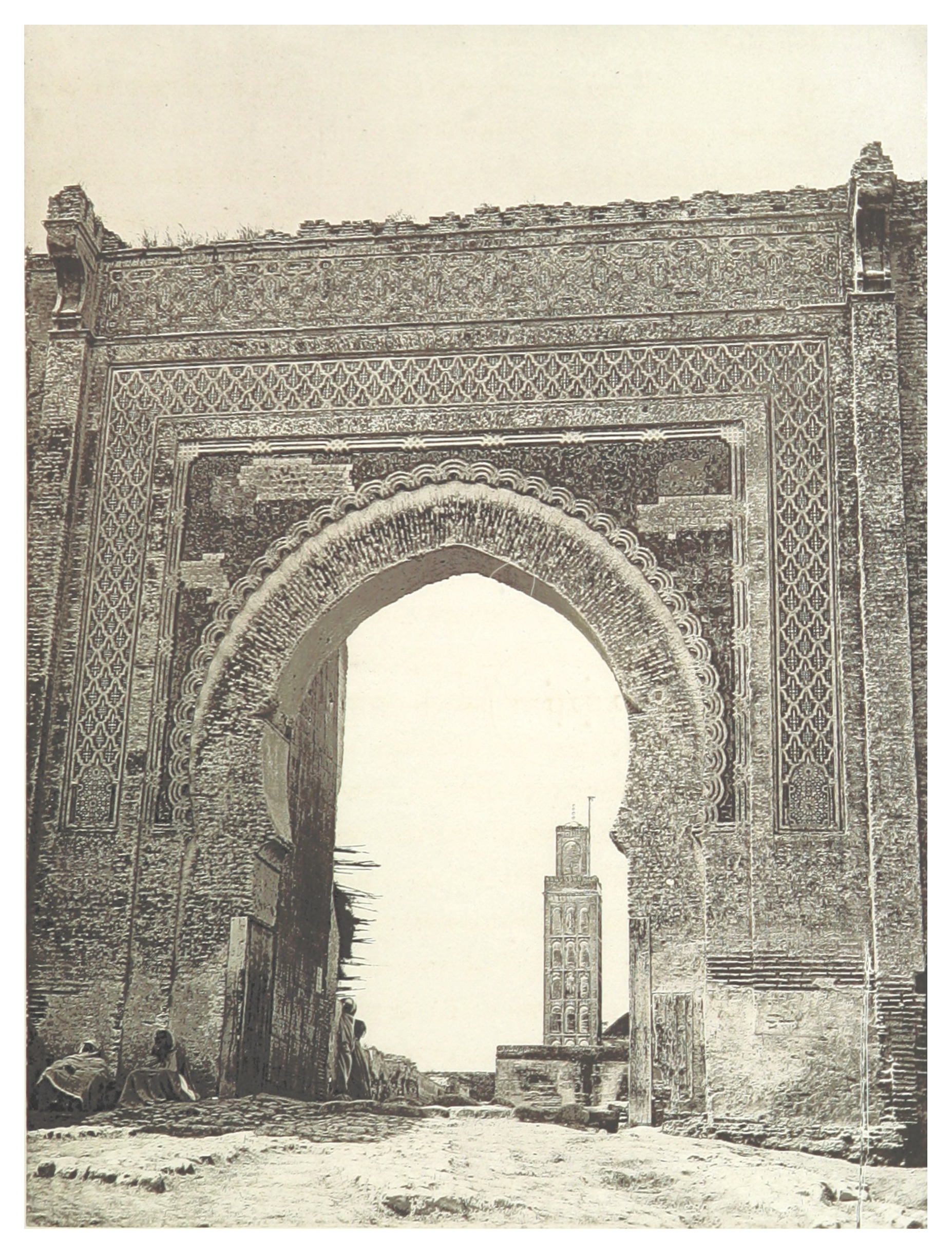
View of Bab Berda'in gate and the minaret of the Bab Barda'in Mosque (photograph from 1881)

One of the last constructions before his death, carried out between 1721 and 1725, was the Heri al-Mansur, a palace on the far southern edge of the kasbah which included vast stables. The monumental gate known as Bab al-Mansur al-'Alj, overlooking Place al-Hedim, was only finished in 1732 by his son Moulay Abdallah. His son and brief successor, Moulay Ahmad ad-Dhahabi, carried out modifications to his father's mausoleum during his two brief reigns (in 1727–28 and 1728–29) and was himself buried here in 1729.

=== Later Alaouite period (18th–20th centuries) ===
Following Moulay Isma'il's death, however, the political situation in Morocco degenerated into relative anarchy as his sons competed for power. Meknes lost its status as capital and suffered damage in the 1755 earthquake. The city was neglected and many parts of the enormous imperial kasbah fell into disrepair. The site received only occasional royal attention in the following centuries. Sultan Muhammad ibn Abdallah, who ruled between 1757 and 1790, built a number of projects in the city. He added the Dar al-Bayda Palace in the Agdal garden to the southeast of the main palace complex, which was later turned into a royal military academy. He constructed the Er-Roua Mosque in the southern part of Moulay Isma'il's Kasbah, which became the largest mosque in Meknes. He also renovated and added a qubba over the tomb of Sidi Mohammed ben Aissa (just outside the city walls) and built the current minarets of the Grand Mosque and the Nejjarine Mosque in the old city. The Dar al-Kebira, however, was abandoned and progressively transformed into a residential neighbourhood where the inhabitants constructed their houses within and between the former palace structures of Isma'il's time. In the early 19th century, Sultan Moulay Abd ar-Rahman added a loggia structure in front of Bab al-Mansur which served as a meeting place for ceremonies and the governor's tribunal, though this structure was later removed.

=== Recent history (20th–21st centuries) ===
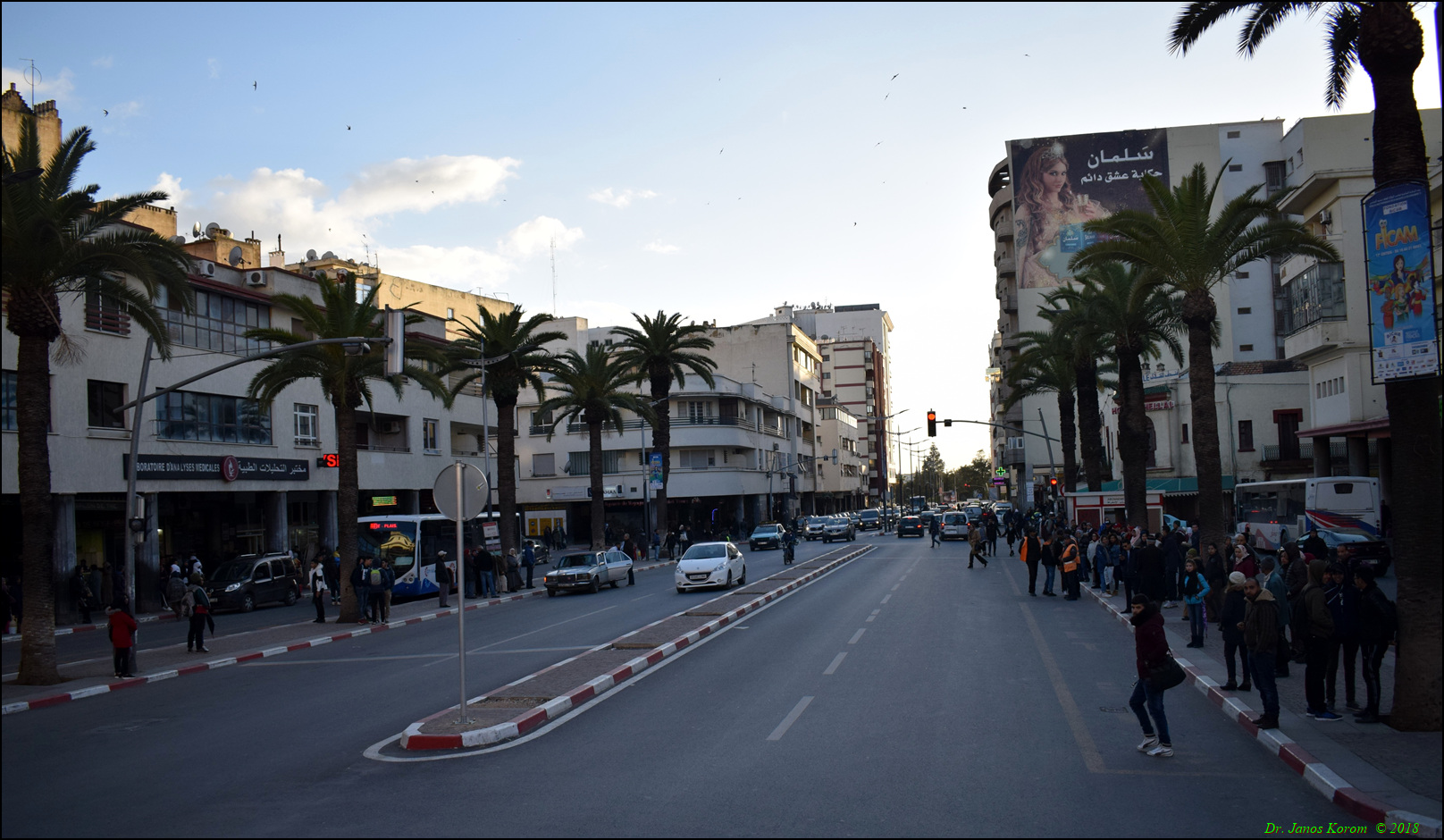
A main street in the Ville Nouvelle (new city)

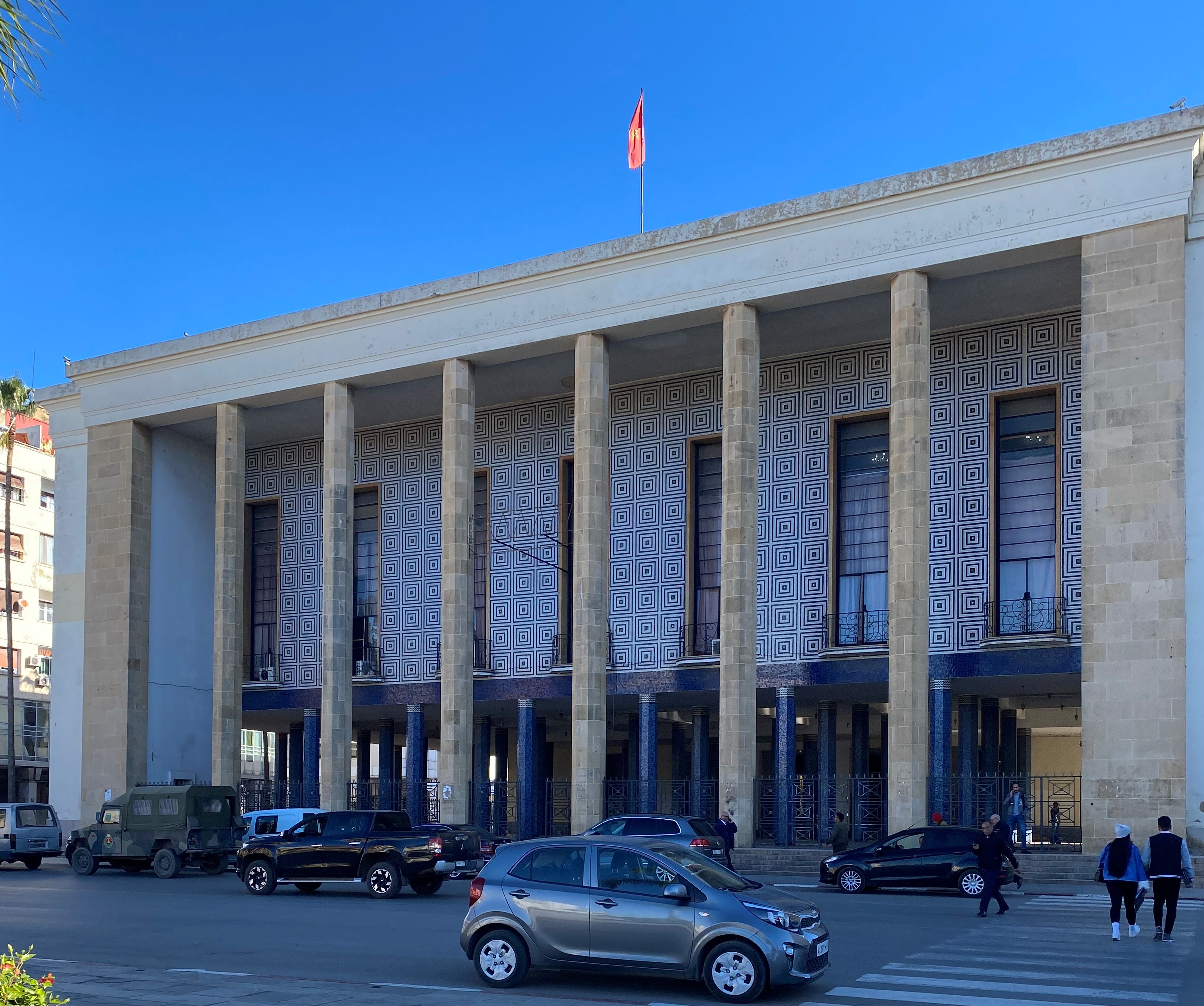
City Hall of Meknes, built between 1934 and 1950 on a 1933 design by architect Gaston Goupil

After the installation of French colonial rule in Morocco in 1912, the French administration created a new city (Ville Nouvelle) on a nearby plateau across the valley on the northeast side of the old city. The capital of Morocco was moved from Fes to Rabat, further marginalizing cities like Meknes (which is near Fes). Some traditional Muslim authorities and officials were retained, but Meknes was reorganized under a new French municipal and military regime. This also led to a greater influence of the cities over their surrounding countryside and growing urbanization. The city became a transportation hub for people and goods traveling from east to west or from north to south across the country, in addition to hosting extensive military barracks. The population of Meknes grew from 25,000 at the beginning of the century to over 140,000 by the mid-20th century. Some roads in the old city were widened to accommodate greater circulation, but most of the new development took place in the Ville Nouvelle. The new French authorities took interest in the conservation of historic monuments in the old city; the madrasas, for example, were restored in 1922. During this period Meknes also became a center of agriculture and viniculture, led mainly by French colonists who appropriated large amounts of land nearby.

Nonetheless, Meknes, like other cities, also hosted resistance to French authority. In 1937, a particularly serious and violent revolt erupted following attempts to divert the local river to benefit the French settler population during a time of food shortages for the native Moroccan population. A violent suppression of protests took place in the city which results in 13 dead and more injured. Following Morocco's independence in 1956, the changes which began or accelerated under French rule continued to run their course. Large scale rural migration increased the population of the city and intensified the urbanization process (as elsewhere in the country). Industries developed around the city's perimeter, but at the same time the old elites and bourgeois families moved away to the coastal cities like Casablanca and Rabat.

These changes also contributed to the relative neglect of the old city. According to the ICOMOS Heritage at Risk report of 2000, the historic city of Meknes contains insufficient drainage systems, and as a result, suffers from inundation and leakage in certain areas. Still, some conservation and restoration efforts have taken place in recent years, motivated in part by the revenues of tourism. As of 2023, a number of major restoration projects were planned or underway, led by ADER-Fès (Agence pour la Dédensification et la Réhabilitation de la Médina de Fès), a quasi-governmental agency based in Fez. The projects include proposed restorations to the historic city walls, to the Heri es-Swani, and to the Bou Inania Madrasa, along with other improvements to parking and tourism infrastructure.

== Geography ==
The historic garden of Al-Haboul in the Medina

Meknes is located in a strategic position in the heart of Morocco. To its south and south-east are the rich cedar forests and mountains of the Middle Atlas mountains with the cities Ifrane and Azrou; and more to the south are the rich oases of Tafilalt. To the west are the two largest metropolitan areas of Morocco: Casablanca and Rabat. To the north is the mountainous north of Morocco with the cities of Tangier and Tétouan. Oujda and Fes lie east of Meknes.

=== Climate ===
Meknes has a hot-summer Mediterranean climate (Köppen climate classification Csa) with continental influences. Its climate is similar to some inland cities in southern Portugal (such as Beja or Évora) and some areas of southern Spain. The temperatures shifts from cool in winter to hot days in the summer months of June–September. Afternoon temperatures generally rise 10–14 °C above the low on most days. The winter highs typically reach only 15.5 °C (59.9 °F) in December–January, whereas night temperatures average 5 °C (41 °F). Snow is rare.

Climate data for Meknes (Bassatine Air Base) (1991–2020, extremes 1919–present)
Month	Jan	Feb	Mar	Apr	May	Jun	Jul	Aug	Sep	Oct	Nov	Dec	Year
Record high °C (°F)	26.9 (80.4)	30.7 (87.3)	32.6 (90.7)	39.4 (102.9)	41.7 (107.1)	43.9 (111.0)	46.8 (116.2)	46.2 (115.2)	43.0 (109.4)	37.7 (99.9)	36.4 (97.5)	27.1 (80.8)	46.8 (116.2)
Mean maximum °C (°F)	20.9 (69.6)	23.0 (73.4)	27.0 (80.6)	29.7 (85.5)	33.4 (92.1)	37.5 (99.5)	40.6 (105.1)	40.3 (104.5)	36.3 (97.3)	31.2 (88.2)	25.8 (78.4)	21.4 (70.5)	39.45 (103.01)
Mean daily maximum °C (°F)	15.8 (60.4)	17.0 (62.6)	19.6 (67.3)	21.7 (71.1)	26.1 (79.0)	30.4 (86.7)	34.1 (93.4)	34.1 (93.4)	29.7 (85.5)	25.7 (78.3)	19.9 (67.8)	16.9 (62.4)	24.2 (75.6)
Daily mean °C (°F)	10.4 (50.7)	11.4 (52.5)	13.8 (56.8)	15.6 (60.1)	19.3 (66.7)	23.0 (73.4)	26.2 (79.2)	26.4 (79.5)	23.0 (73.4)	19.6 (67.3)	14.6 (58.3)	11.7 (53.1)	17.9 (64.2)
Mean daily minimum °C (°F)	5.0 (41.0)	5.7 (42.3)	7.8 (46.0)	9.4 (48.9)	12.4 (54.3)	15.4 (59.7)	18.2 (64.8)	18.7 (65.7)	16.2 (61.2)	13.5 (56.3)	9.2 (48.6)	6.4 (43.5)	11.5 (52.7)
Mean minimum °C (°F)	−0.3 (31.5)	1.2 (34.2)	2.5 (36.5)	4.0 (39.2)	6.5 (43.7)	10.7 (51.3)	13.7 (56.7)	14.0 (57.2)	11.8 (53.2)	7.9 (46.2)	3.5 (38.3)	1.3 (34.3)	−0.54 (31.03)
Record low °C (°F)	−4.2 (24.4)	−2.2 (28.0)	−1.5 (29.3)	0.0 (32.0)	3.0 (37.4)	6.8 (44.2)	10.0 (50.0)	10.5 (50.9)	7.0 (44.6)	2.0 (35.6)	−1.8 (28.8)	−3.5 (25.7)	−4.2 (24.4)
Average precipitation mm (inches)	61.5 (2.42)	55.2 (2.17)	57.4 (2.26)	45.7 (1.80)	28.6 (1.13)	8.5 (0.33)	1.1 (0.04)	3.3 (0.13)	21.9 (0.86)	49.2 (1.94)	63.3 (2.49)	65.6 (2.58)	461.3 (18.16)
Average snowfall cm (inches)	0.48 (0.189)	0.31 (0.124)	0.06 (0.024)	0.00 (0.0007)	0.0 (0.0)	0.0 (0.0)	0.0 (0.0)	0.0 (0.0)	0.0 (0.0)	0.0 (0.0)	0.02 (0.0066)	0.20 (0.0803)	1.07 (0.4246)
Average precipitation days (≥ 1.0 mm)	6.9	6.6	6.9	6.1	4.0	1.0	0.3	0.7	2.4	5.2	6.3	7.0	53.4
Average snowy days	0.5	0.4	0.1	0.0	0.0	0.0	0.0	0.0	0.0	0.0	0.1	0.3	1.4
Average relative humidity (%)	75	78	76	75	72	68	57	57	62	70	72	77	70
Average dew point °C (°F)	3.2 (37.8)	3.9 (39.0)	5.6 (42.1)	7.5 (45.5)	10.4 (50.7)	13.3 (55.9)	15.8 (60.4)	16.0 (60.8)	14.0 (57.2)	10.7 (51.3)	6.8 (44.2)	4.1 (39.4)	9.3 (48.7)
Mean monthly sunshine hours	192.2	187.6	244.9	255.0	300.7	324.0	362.7	344.1	282.0	248.0	195.0	186.0	3,122.2
Percentage possible sunshine	60.8	60.9	66.4	65.4	69.8	74.5	81.8	82.8	75.8	70.8	61.9	60.0	70.1
Average ultraviolet index	5	7	9	10	11	12	13	12	11	9	6	5	9
Source 1: NOAA
Source 2: DWD

=== Districts - Quartiers (in French) ===
Meknes Commune's council office

Agdal; Al Bassatine; Ancienne Médina; Bab El Khmiss; Bel Air; Belle Vue (1, 2 et 3); Berrima; Bni-Mhmmed; Borj Meshqoq; Borj Moulay Omar; Kamilia	Diour Salam; El Hedim Place; El Malah Lakdim; El Manar; El Mansour (1, 2, 3 et 4); Ennasre; Hamria (new city district); Hay Salam; Hacienda; Hay El Fakharin	Kasbat Hadress; Marjane; Mellah; Neejarine; Ouislane (municipality); Place d'Armes; Plaisance (El Menzeh); Riad; Roua; Rouamzine; Sbata; Sidi Amar	Sidi Baba; Sidi Bouzekri; Sidi Said; Touargua; Toulal (municipality); Volubilis; Wjeh Arouss; Zerhounia; Zehoua; Zitoune

=== Prefecture ===
Meknes is the seat of the prefecture of Meknès, which consists of 6 municipalities (including the city Meknes) and 15 rural communes.

== Historic monuments and landmarks ==
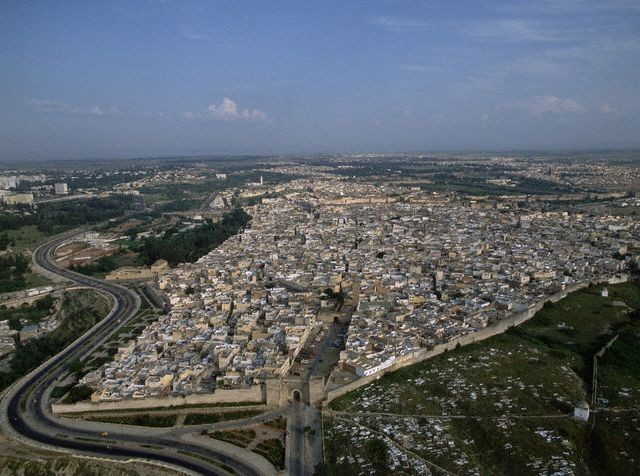
Aerial view of the northern part of the old medina of Meknes, near Bab Berda'in

The main historic monuments of the city are concentrated in the medina (old city) and the vast former Kasbah of Moulay Ismail to the south. The most notable monuments are listed below.

=== Place el-Hedim ===
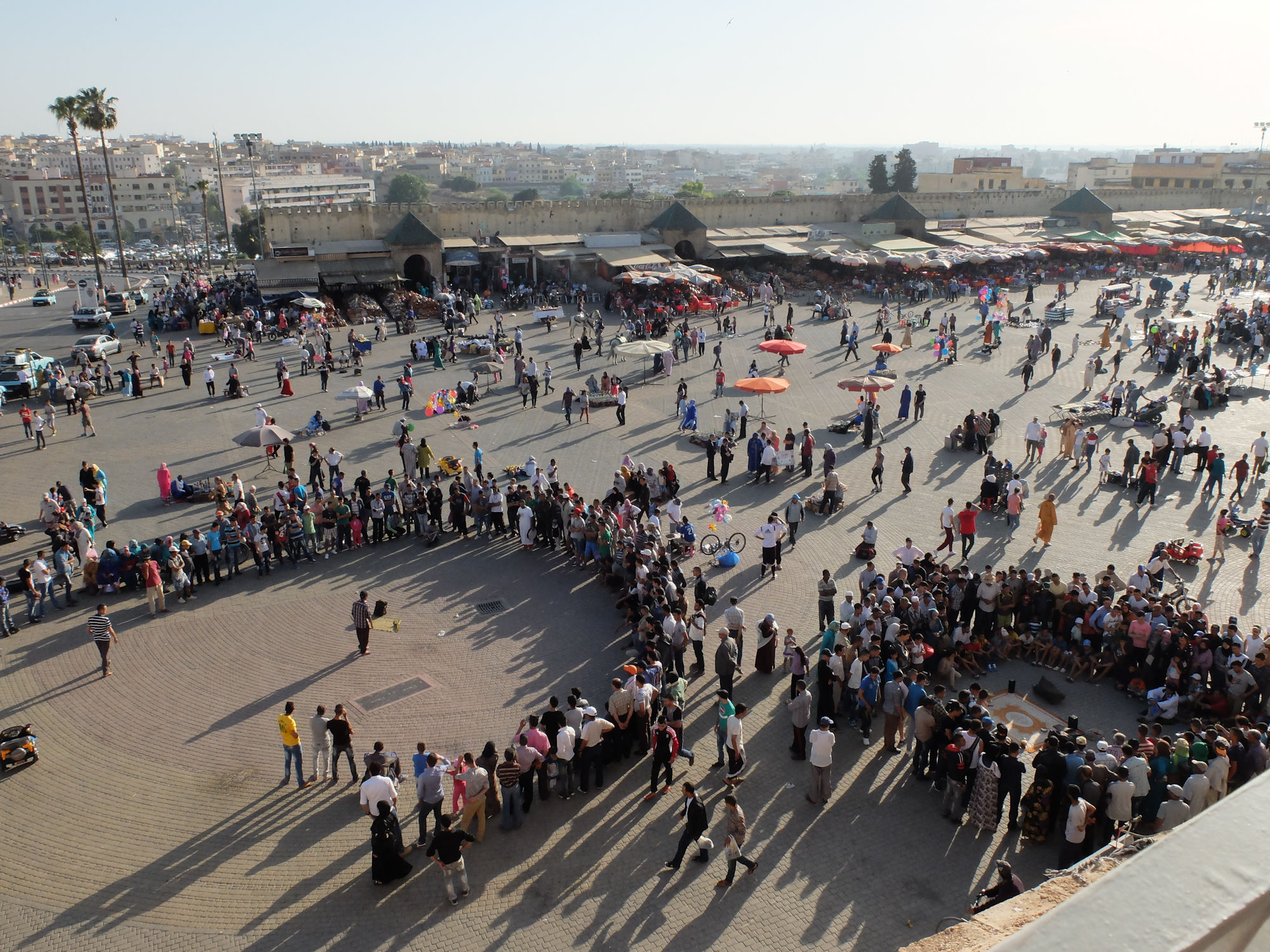
Crowds gathering in el-Hedim Square at the end of the day

Often compared to the Jemaa el-Fnaa square in Marrakesh, el-Hedim Square (Place el-Hedim) is a vast plaza at the southern end of the old city, before the main gates of Moulay Isma'il's former royal palace complex. The square's name, el-Hedim, means "the rubble/debris" and refers to the demolitions which Moulay Isma'il carried out here during the construction of his palaces. He left this open space as a public square to separate his palace from the rest of the city. Since then, the square has become the focus of various activities including evening entertainers such as storytellers, acrobats, and musicians.

=== Mosques and madrasas ===
- Grand mosque of Meknes: The old city's most important mosque and one of its oldest, covering about 3,500 square meters and was founded in the 12th century by the Almoravids, although renovated many times since.
- Madrasa Bou Inania: The city's most famous madrasa (school for higher learning in Islamic sciences) was established by the Marinid sultan Abu al-Hasan in 1335-36 but is now named after his son Abu Inan (who may have later restored it). Open to tourists today, it is one of the most richly decorated buildings in the city.
- Nejjarine Mosque: Often reputed to be the oldest in the city, this mosque also dates back to the Almoravid period, though it has been modified multiple times.
- Lalla Aouda Mosque: The main mosque of the city's former kasbah and of Moulay Isma'il's palaces, it was first founded in the Marinid era but completely rebuilt by Moulay Isma'il between 1672 and 1678. Its prominent minaret is visible from the adjoining Place Lalla Aouda (Lalla Awda Square).
- Bab Berda'in Mosque: The mosque, located near the northern gate of the medina (Bab Berda'in) was completed in 1709 on the orders of Morocco's first female minister, Khnata bent Bakkar. The mosque was the site of a tragedy in 2010 when its historic minaret collapsed, killing 41 people. The mosque has since been repaired and its minaret rebuilt.
- Ar-Roua Mosque: The largest mosque in Meknes, it was built by Sultan Muhammad ibn Abdallah between 1757 and 1790. It is located near the Heri al-Mansur palace in the southern part of the Kasbah of Moulay Isma'il.
- Zitouna Mosque: A large mosque founded by Sultan Moulay Isma'il around 1687.
- Zawiya of Sidi Mohammed Ben Aissa: Also known as the Mausoleum of Sheikh al-Kamel. An important mausoleum and religious complex (zawiya) just outside the city walls to the northwest, originally dating from the late 18th century but restored later. Mohamed ben 'Aissa, founder of the Aissawiya, a major Sufi brotherhood in Morocco, is buried here. He is considered the patron saint of Meknes, and his annual moussem (festival) is one of the most intense and was historically known for its displays of self-mutilation.
- Zawiya of Sidi Kaddour el-Alami: A richly decorated mosque and religious complex honoring the tomb of Sidi Kaddour el-Alami, a famous Moroccan poet who died in 1850.
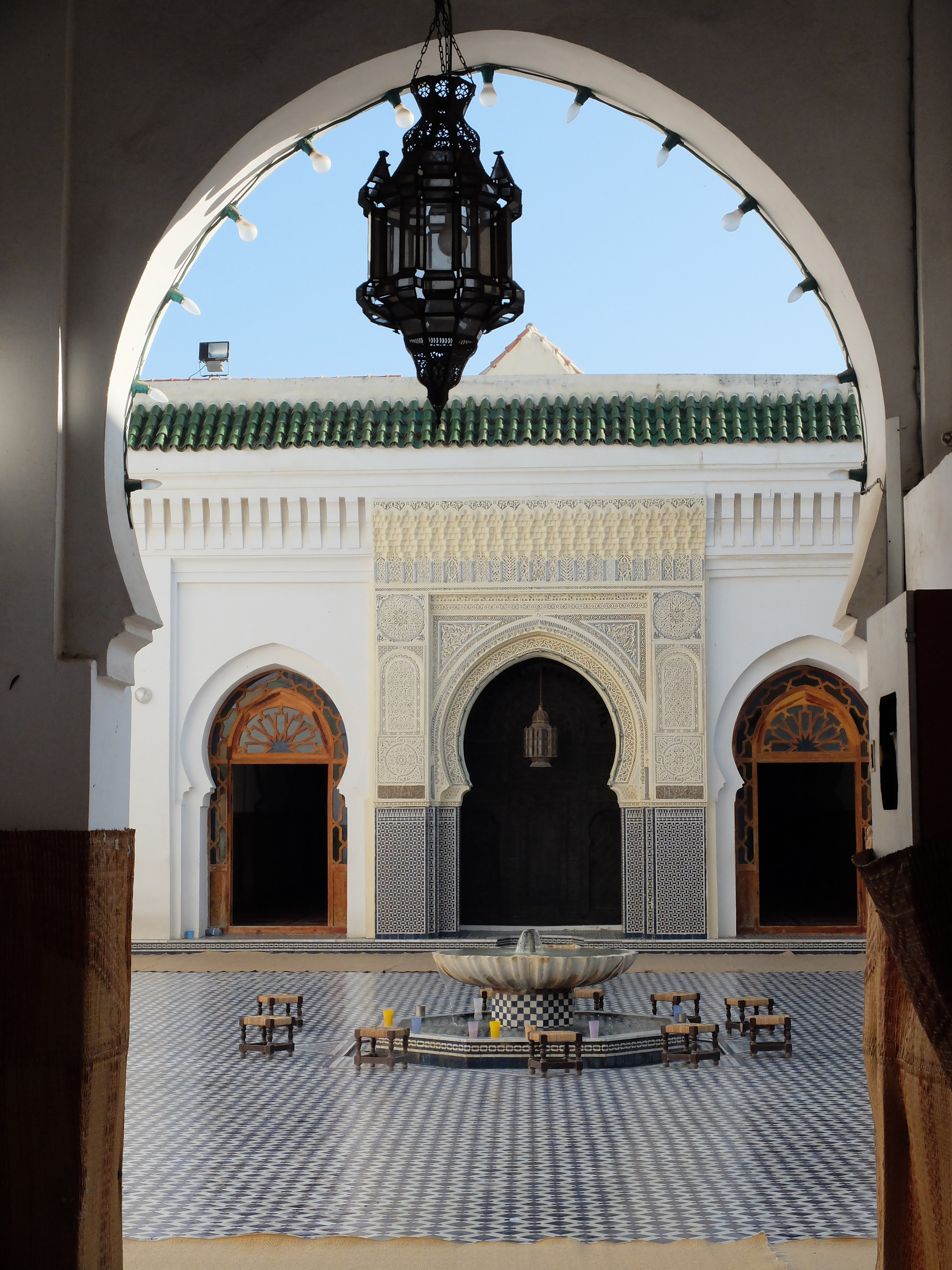
View into the courtyard (sahn) of the Grand Mosque of Meknes

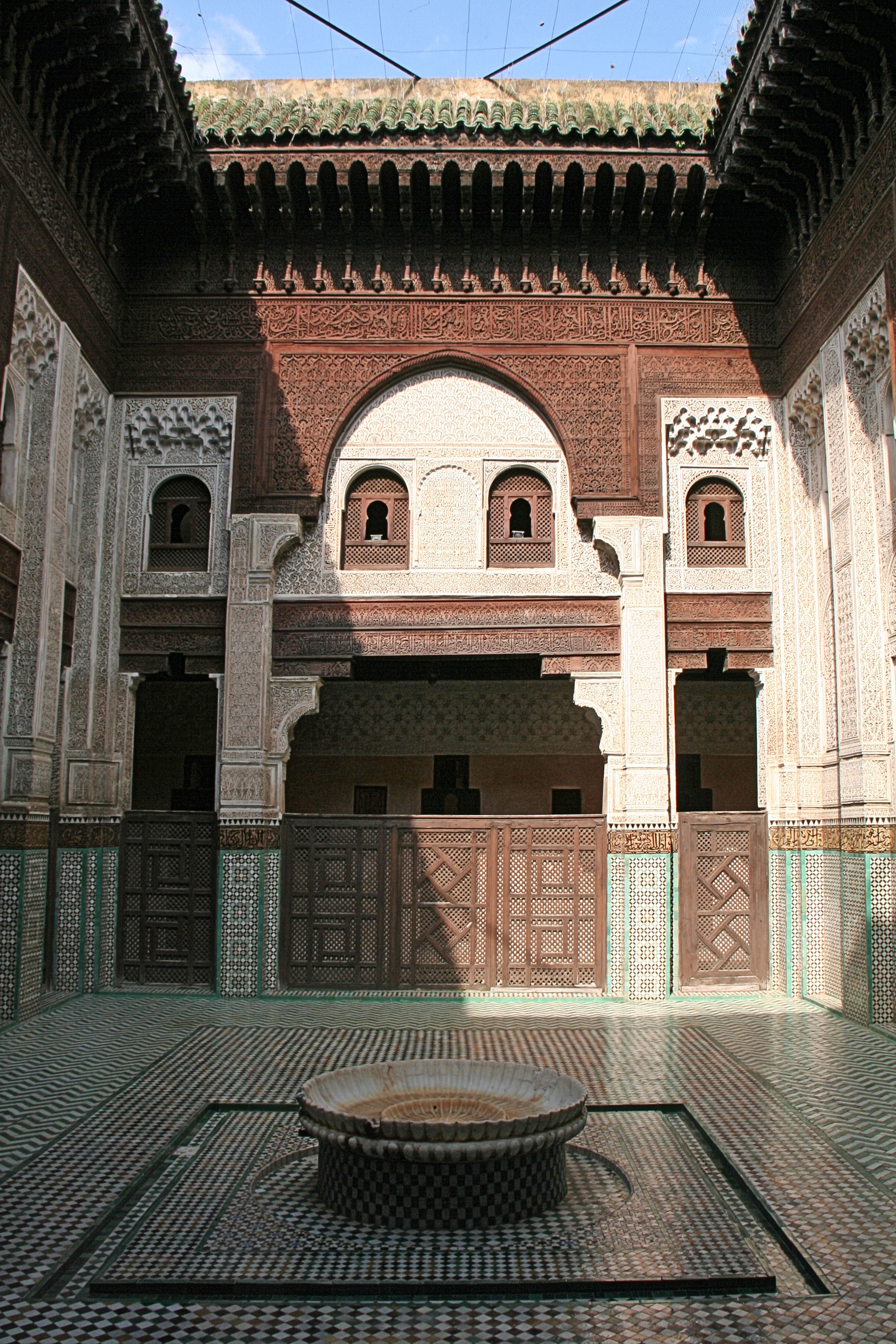
The Bou Inania Madrasa

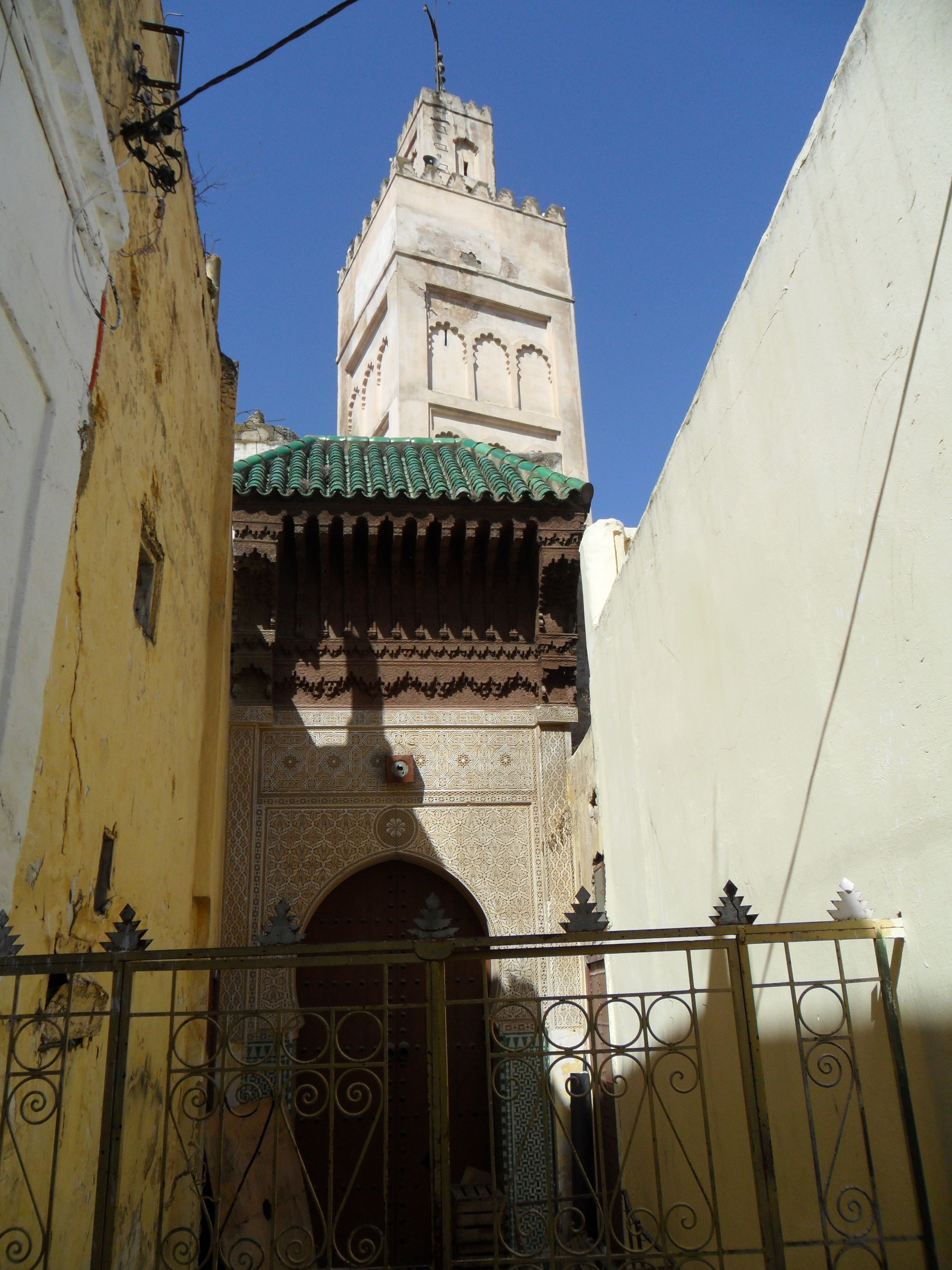
Nejjarine Mosque

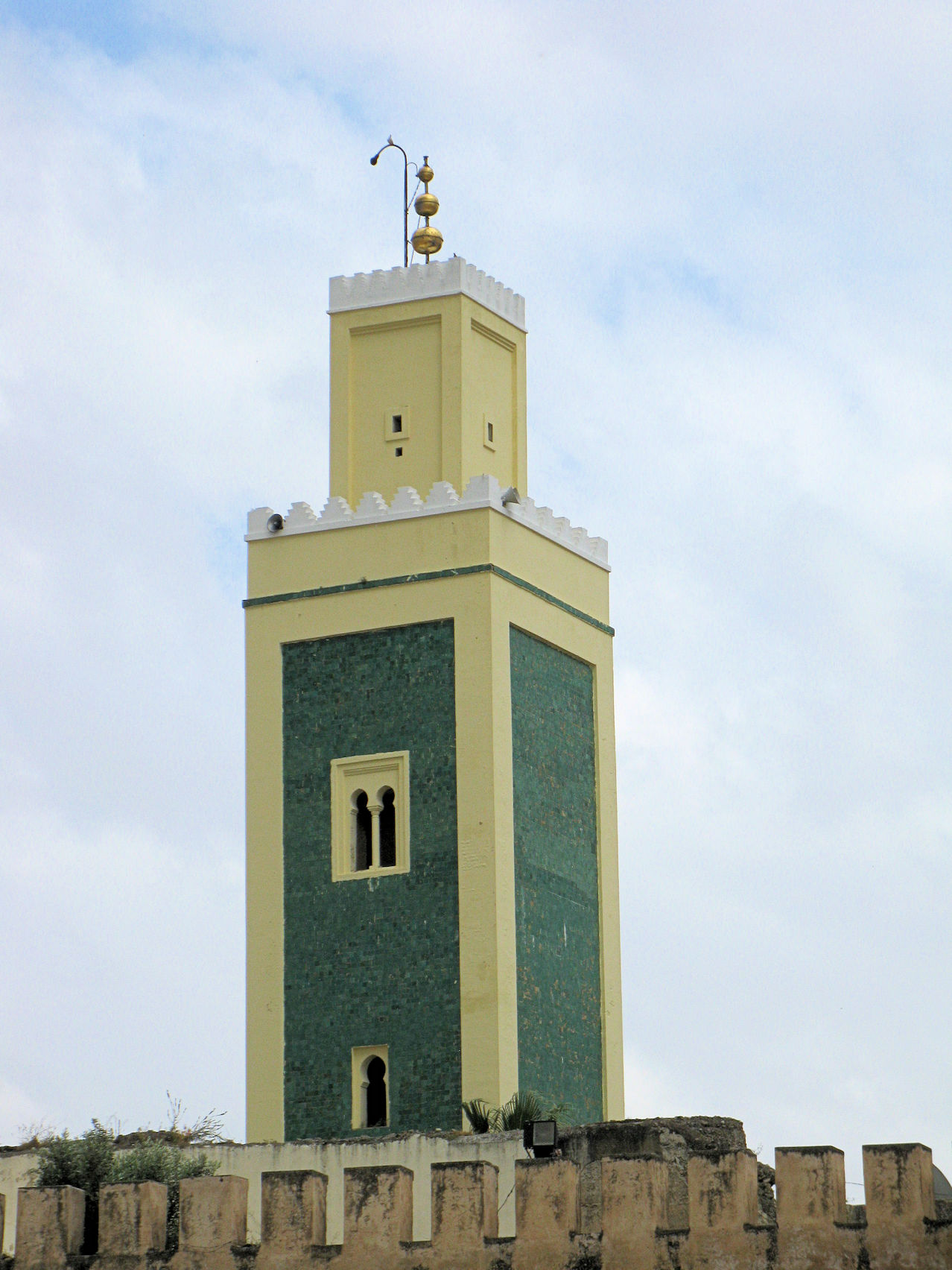
Minaret of the Lalla Aouda Mosque

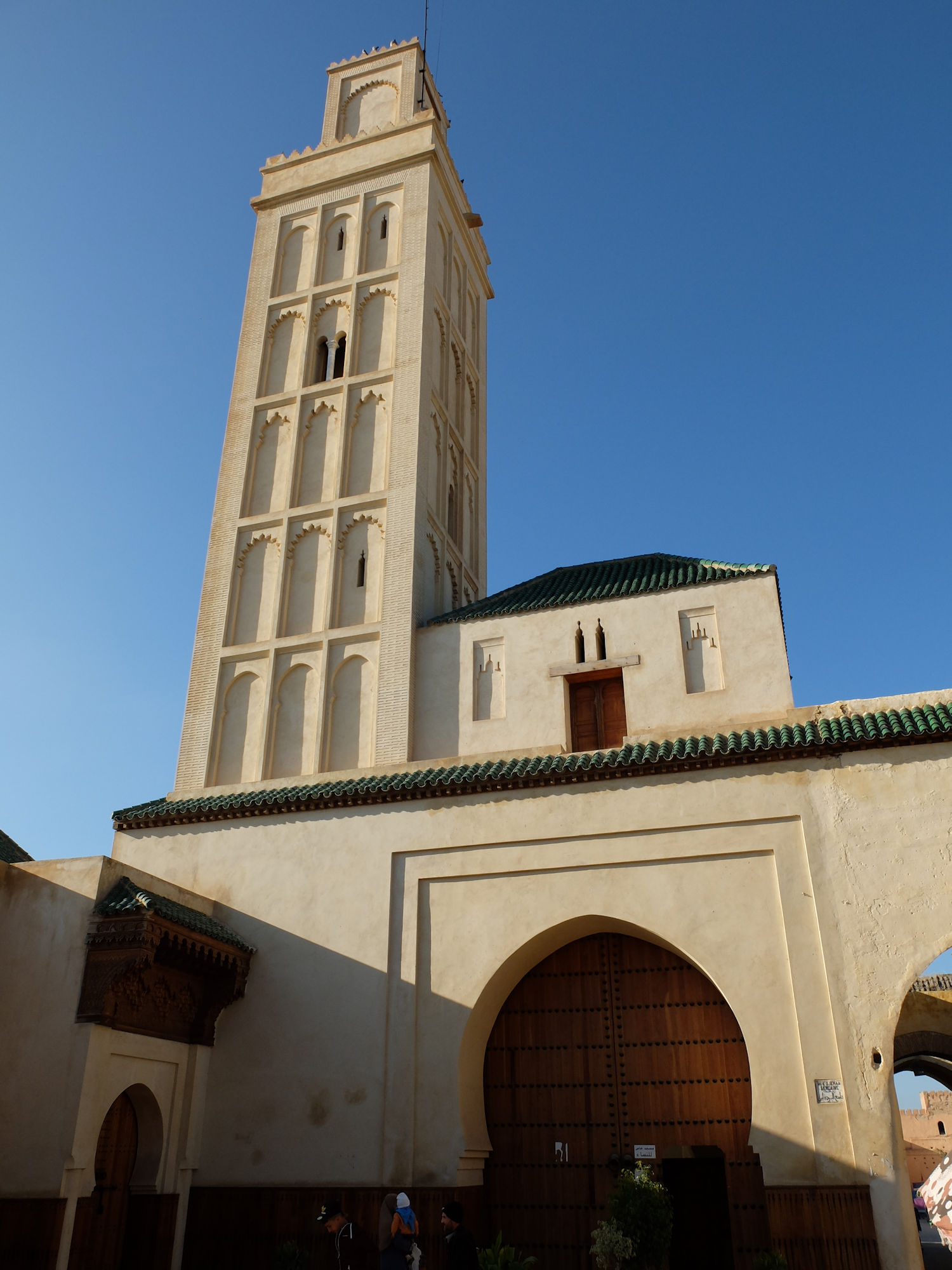
Bab Berda'in Mosque (pictured after 2010)

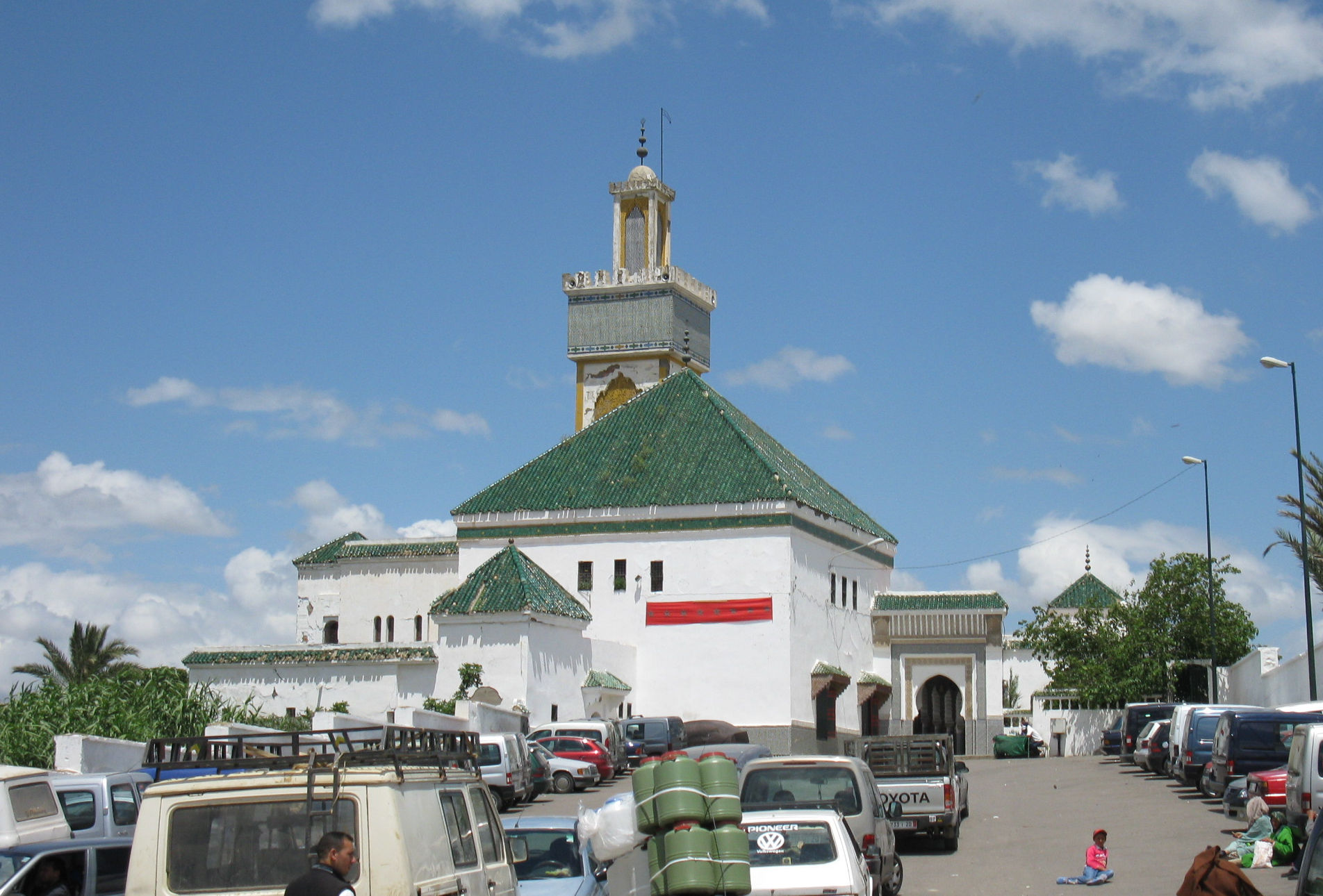
Zawiya of Sidi Mohammed Ben Aissa

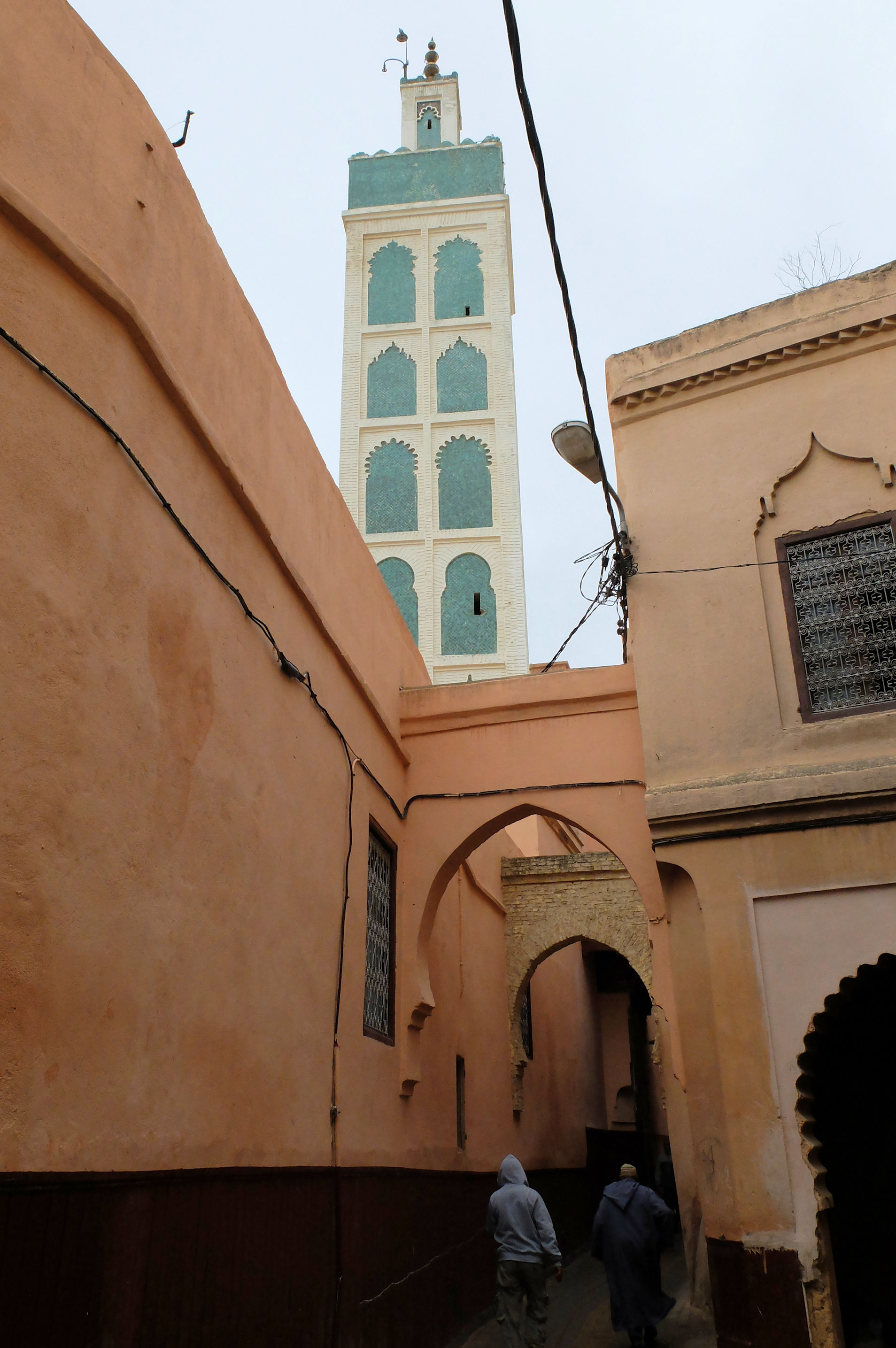
Zawiya of Sidi Kaddour el-Alami (view of the minaret and outer wall)

=== Fortifications and gates ===
- Bab Mansur al-'Alj: The most famous gateway of the city (also known as Bab Mansour or Bab el-Mansur), this gate overlooks the southern end of Place el-Hedim and acted as the ceremonial grand entrance to the Kasbah of Moulay Isma'il. It was begun in the later years of Moulay Isma'il's reign and finished in 1732 by his son Moulay Abdallah. Its name comes from the architect and designer of the gate, Mansour al-'Alj (the "Victorious Apostate"), a former Christian slave who converted to Islam. It is notable for its size and its rich decoration consisting of darj-wa-ktaf motifs carved into brick, filled with colourful zellij (mosaic tilework), and topped by a long and elaborate Arabic inscription painted on tile.
- Bab Jama' an-Nouar: Another ornate gate located next to Bab Mansur; also called Bab al-Nuwwar in some sources.
- Bab ad-Dar al-Kebira: The monumental gate entrance to the Dar al-Kebira palace, dating to 1679–80.
- Bab el-Khemis: A monumental western gate of the city, near the former Mellah, dating from 1687 under the reign of Moulay Ismail and richly decorated with motifs and zellij similar to Bab al-Mansur.
- Bab al-Barda'in: The monumental northern gate of the city, also built by Moulay Isma'il and richly decorated.
- Borj Belkari: A bastion tower built in the 17th century as a part of the defensive walls of the Kasbah of Sultan Moulay Ismail in Meknes, Morocco. Since 2003 it holds a pottery museum.
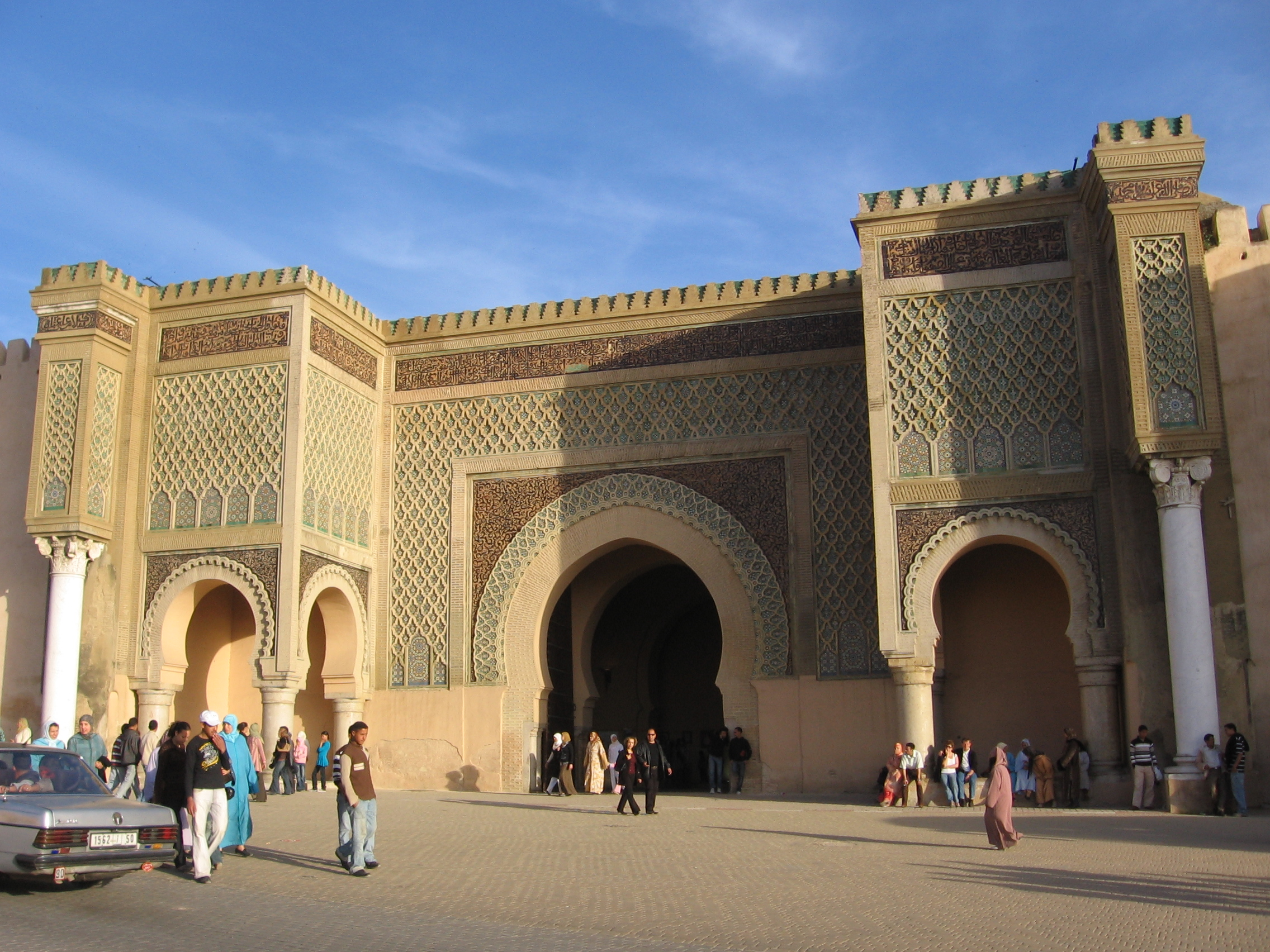
Bab Mansour al-'Alj

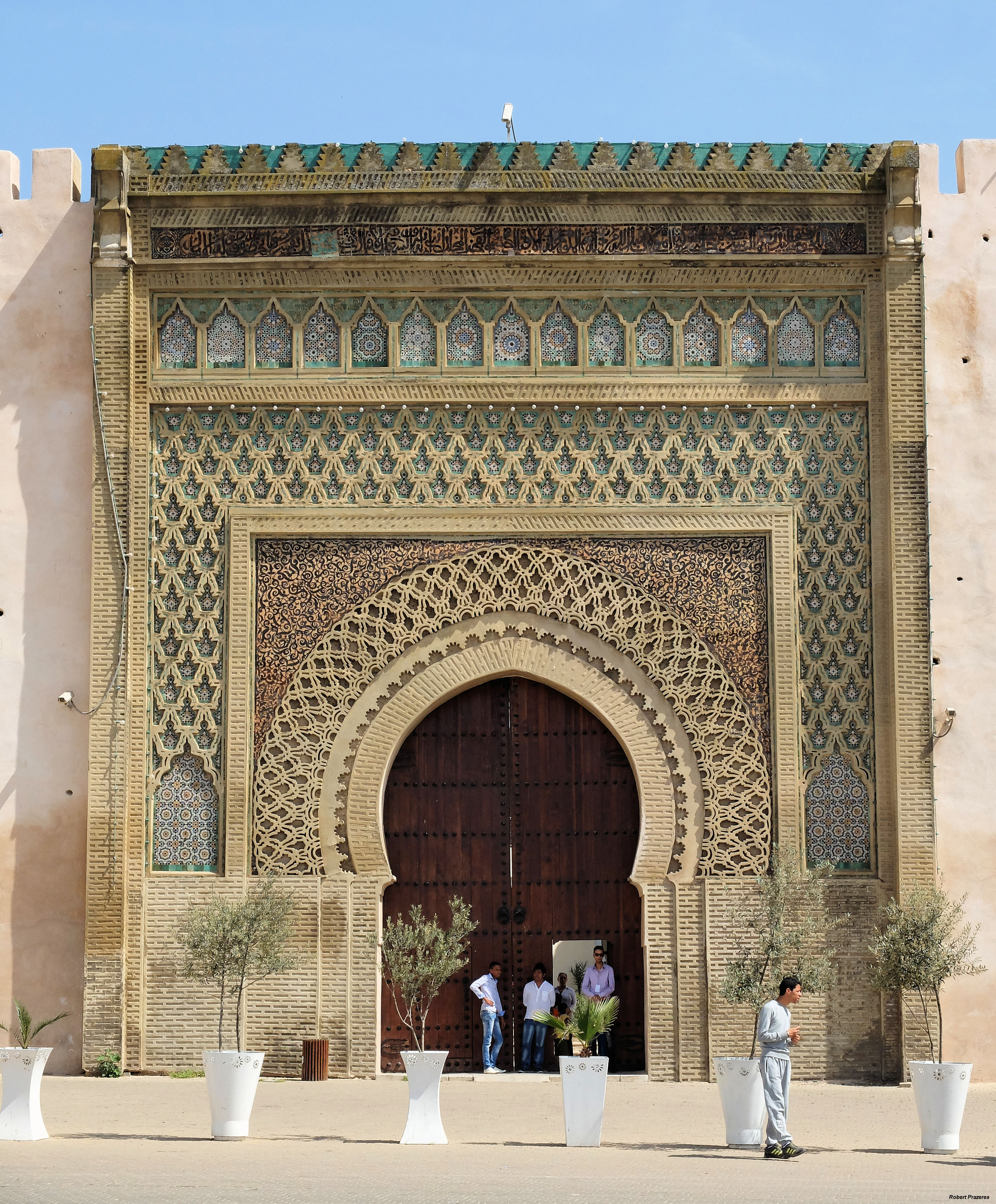
Bab Jama' an-Nouar

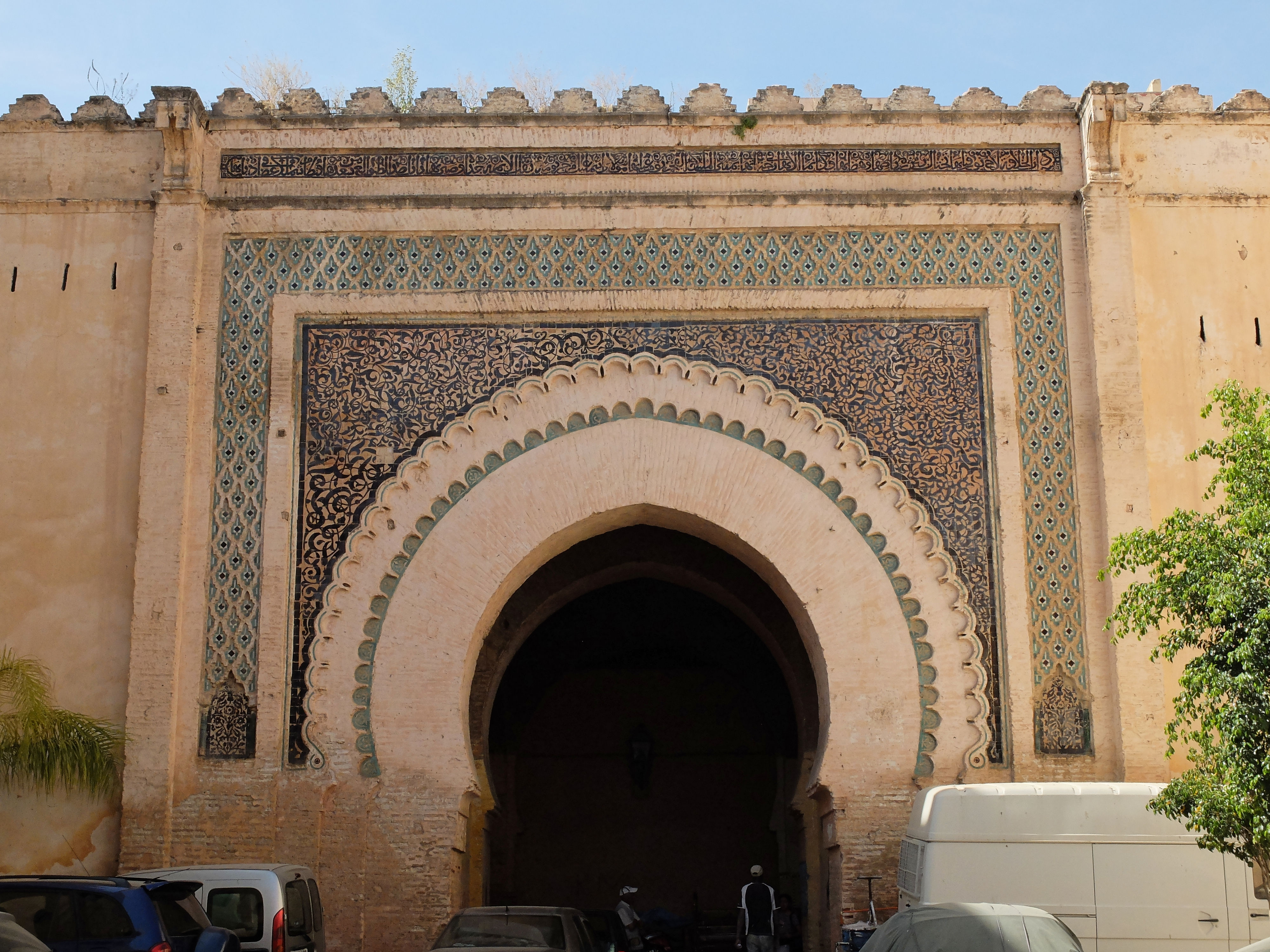
Bab ad-Dar al-Kebira

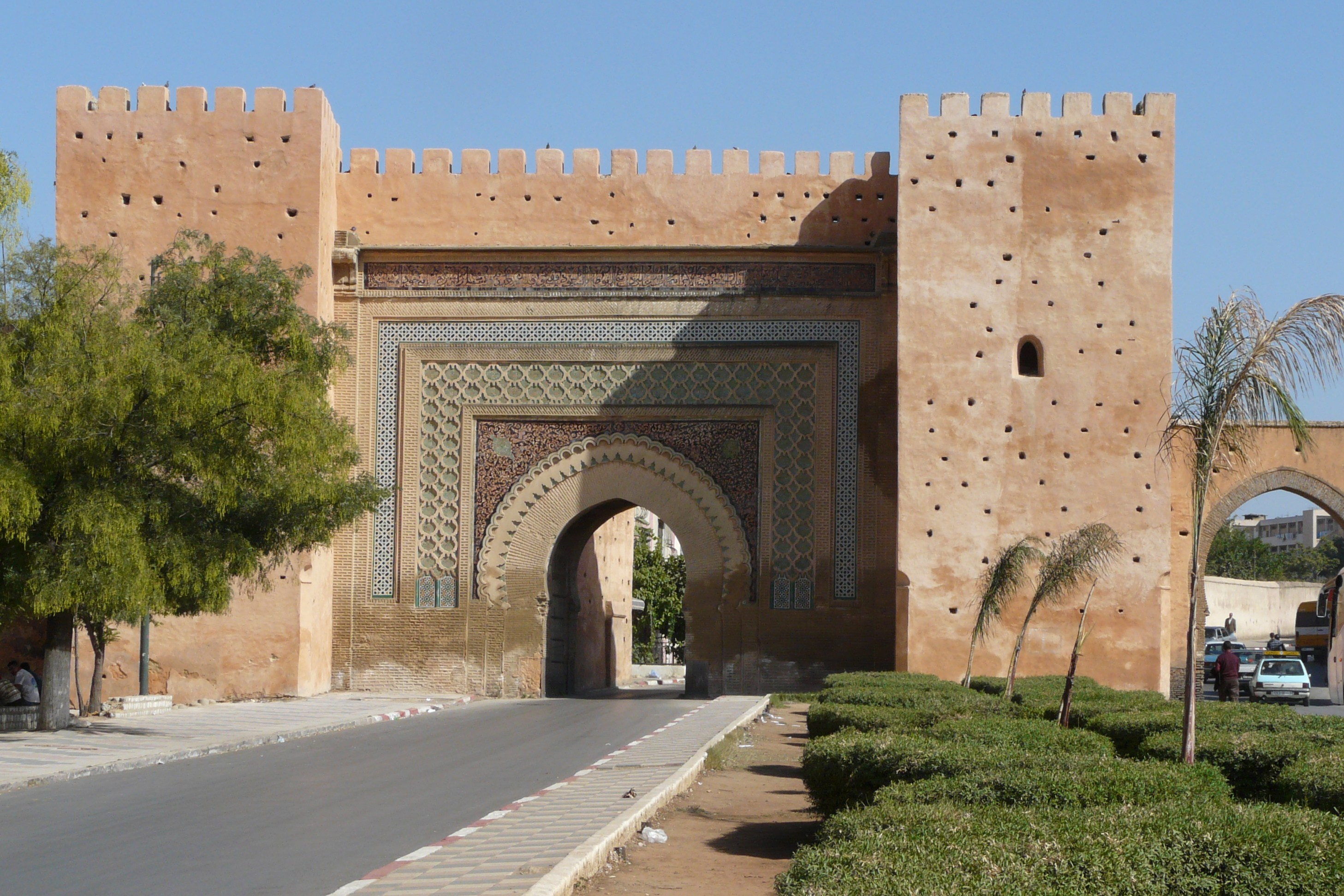
Bab el-Khemis

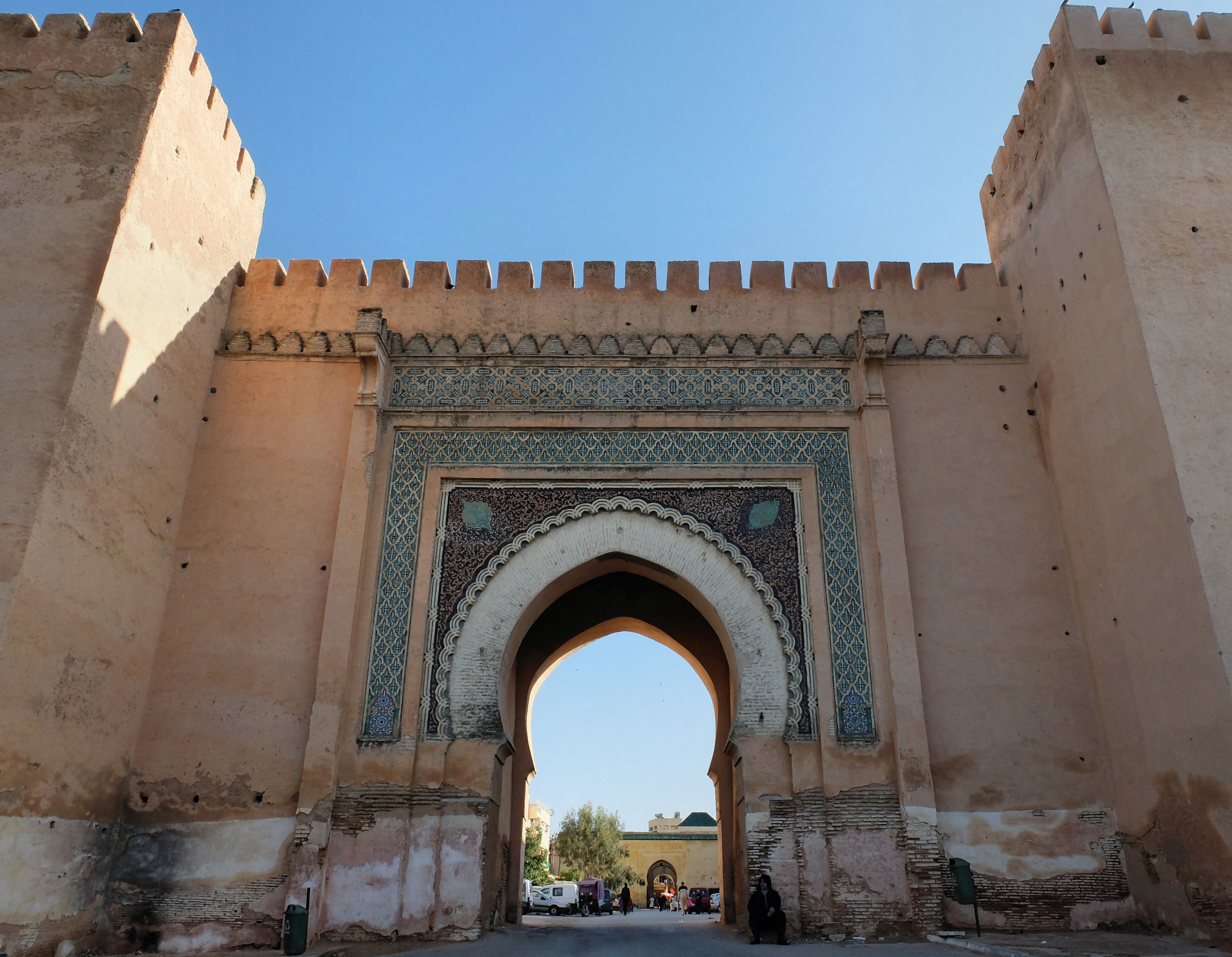
Bab Berda'in

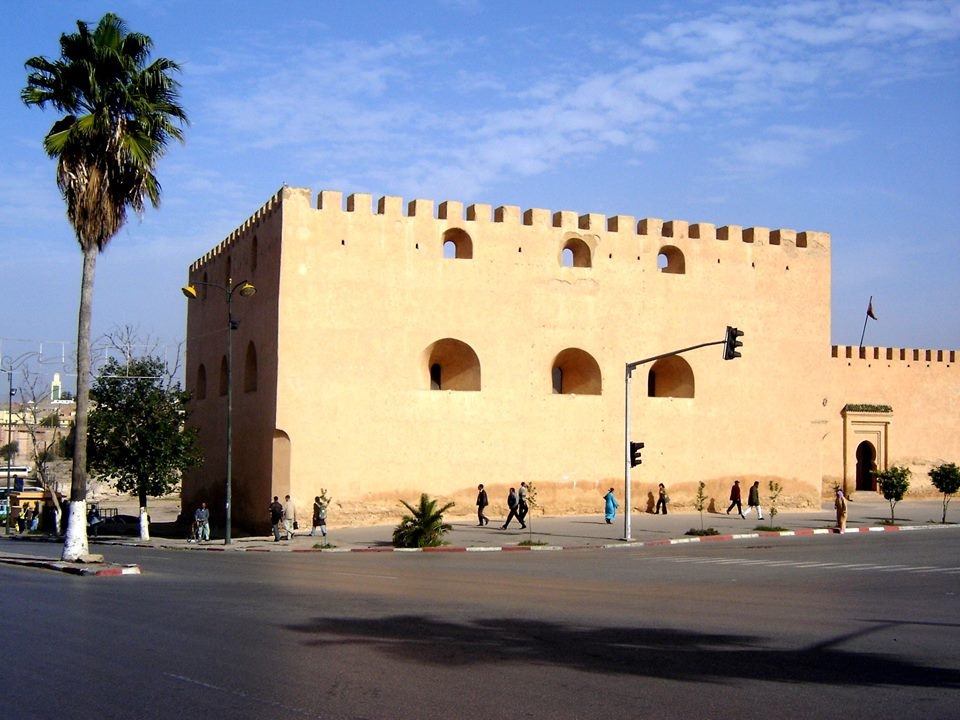
Borj Belkari

=== Imperial Palaces of Moulay Isma'il ===
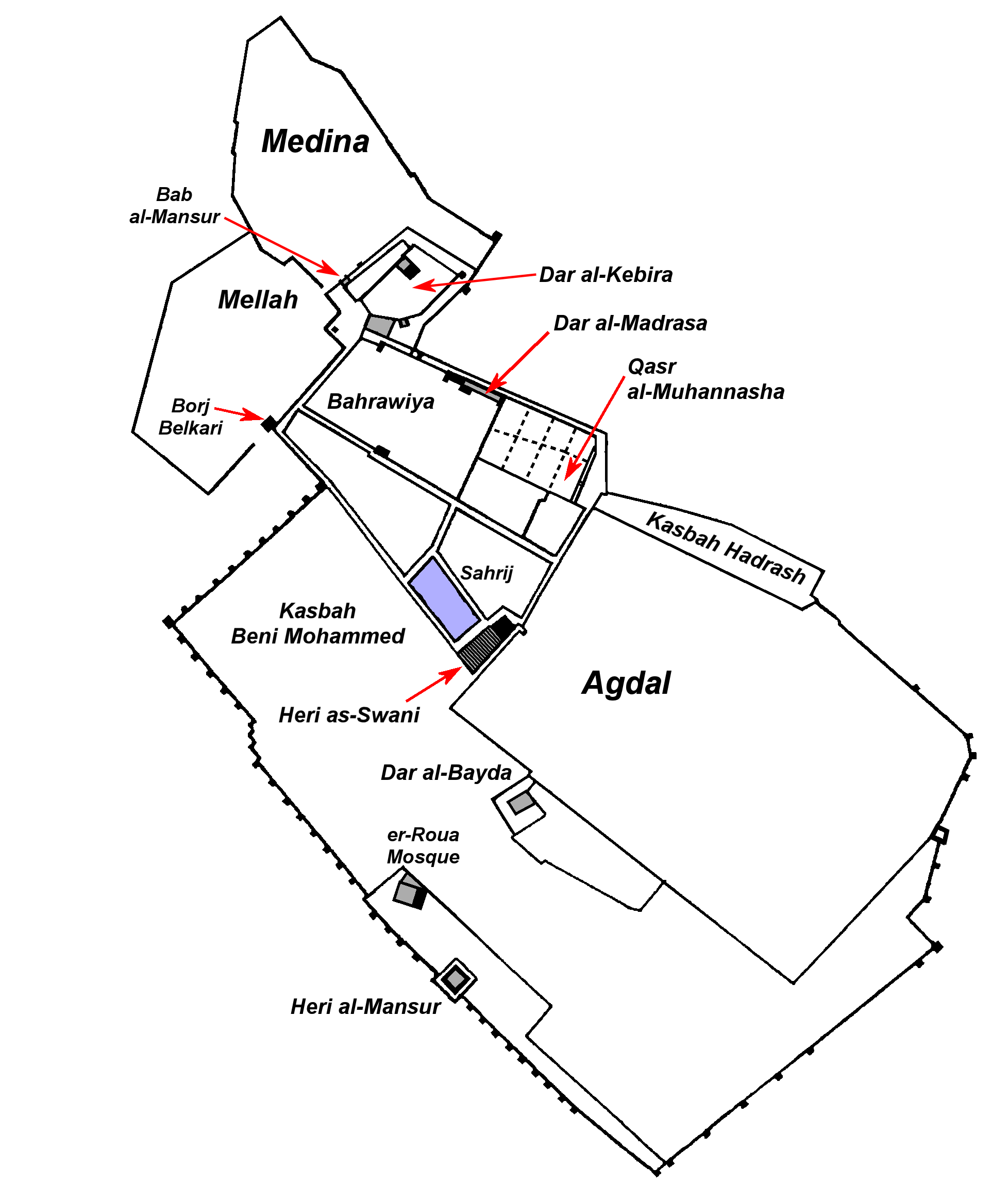
Map of the Kasbah of Moulay Ismail in relation to the medina (old city), with its major areas indicated

The palace complex or "imperial city" of Sultan Moulay Isma'il was constructed over his entire 55-year reign from 1672 to 1727 (with some elements finished or remodeled shortly after). It occupies the site of the city's former medieval kasbah (citadel) and stretches over an area approximately four times larger than the old city itself. It was composed of several autonomous palaces along with vast gardens, religious buildings, and other amenities. The complex was also notable for its impressive infrastructure, which included a water supply system with a hydraulic system of wells, norias (water extraction mechanism powered by wheel), canals, and underground pipes which distributed water to the royal city's many buildings. It also contained numerous monumental granaries and underground warehouses which stockpiled supplies that could allegedly sustain the city for a siege of ten years. Below is a list of some of its main areas and monuments.

- Place Lalla Aouda: A vast open square which stands behind (southeast of) Bab al-Mansur, which served as the former mechouar of the palace. It precedes the former Dar al-Kebira palace and gives access to the Lalla Aouda Mosque.
- Dar el-Kebira: The oldest palace in the kasbah, finished in 1679 and itself composed of multiple palaces. Its name means "the Great House". It was the private residence of the sultan and his family, connected directly to the Lalla Aouda Mosque and the later royal mausoleum. The palace fell into ruin after Moulay Isma'il's death (and after the 1755 Lisbon Earthquake), and has since become a residential neighbourhood where common people built their houses amidst the remains of Isma'il's massive palace walls, still visible in various places.
- Mausoleum of Moulay Isma'il: The royal mausoleum and funerary complex of Moulay Isma'il and some of his family members and successors. It was built under his reign but significantly modified by Ahmad ad-Dhahabi between 1727 and 1729. The funerary complex was originally entered from the dar al-Kebira to the north but is nowadays entered by a 20th-century gate to the south. Still considered a religious site today, it is also open to tourists. It is composed of relatively austere courtyards leading to a richly decorated indoor patio chamber, which in turn grants access to the tomb chamber of the sultan.
- Qubbat al-Khayyatin and the Qara Prison: The Qubbat al-Khayyatin is a standalone audience chamber or throne room where Moulay Isma'il once received foreign ambassadors. Underground, right next to it, is a large subterranean vaulted space known as the Qara Prison or Habs Qara. Although frequently described as a prison for Christian slaves, scholars agree that it was in fact a storage area and granary, one of many such structures throughout the royal city.
- Dar al-Makhzen: This vast walled enclosure, much larger and more rationally organized than the Dar el-Kebira, contained extensive gardens and two more main palaces in Moulay Isma'il's time, some of which have been restored or adapted for current use as one of the royal residences of the King of Morocco. The enclosure, generally known as the Dar al-Makhzen (not to be confused with the royal palaces of the same name in Fez and elsewhere), was divided into two sections. The western section was mostly occupied by the Bahrawiya Gardens but also contained a long narrow palace on its northern edge known as the Dar al-Madrasa ("House of the School"), most likely another private palace of the sultan. The eastern section, which is still entered via an ornate royal gate on its eastern perimeter (north of Heri es-Swani), was mostly occupied by the Qasr al-Muhannasha ("Palace of the Labyrinth"). This palace consisted of roughly eight large courtyards or garden enclosures and acted as both a reception palace and an administrative palace.
- Heri as-Swani and the Sahrij (Agdal Basin): The Sahrij or Agdal Basin is an enormous water basin or artificial lake south of the Dar al-Makhzen, which was originally a part of the royal city's water supply system. It measures 148.75 by 319 meters and is, on average, 1.2 meters deep. Next to it, on its eastern side, is an enormous structure composed of two parts: the "House of the Ten Norias" or Dar al-Ma ("House of Water") and the Heri as-Swani (also spelled as Heri es-Souani). The first of these is a monumental building of vaulted passages and domed chambers which contained a number of wheel-powered hydraulic mechanisms (norias) which drew water from the phreatic table underground to the surface, after which it was delivered into the Sahrij or redistributed to the city. The second part, the Heri as-Swani, is attached to the south side of this building and is made up of 22 rows of monumental arches which once held up a vaulted roof (which has since collapsed). Although frequently misidentified as the "royal stables" of the palace, this structure was, once again, a massive granary and storehouse. Grain was originally delivered to the building by mules who climbed onto a roof terrace and dropped the grain directly into holes pierced above each vaulted chamber.
- Heri al-Mansur: One of the last constructions of Moulay Isma'il's reign, built between 1721 and 1725, its name means "Granary/silo of Victory", but it was also known as Dar al-Mansur or Qasr al-Mansur ("Palace of Victory"). It is located on the far southern perimeter of the Kasbah and consists of a massive building which seems to have served as a palace, fortress, and storehouse. The basement was taken up by storage rooms while the upper floor held reception rooms for the palace with views over the surrounding area. Located next to it were the Royal Stables of Moulay Isma'il (often misidentified today with the Heri as-Swani), which were reputed to be one of the palace city's most impressive features. It consisted of horse stalls sheltered under two parallel arcades (rows of arches) which stretched for 1200 meters on either side of a water canal which provided water for the horses. Unfortunately, the stables have not been preserved and very little remains of them today.
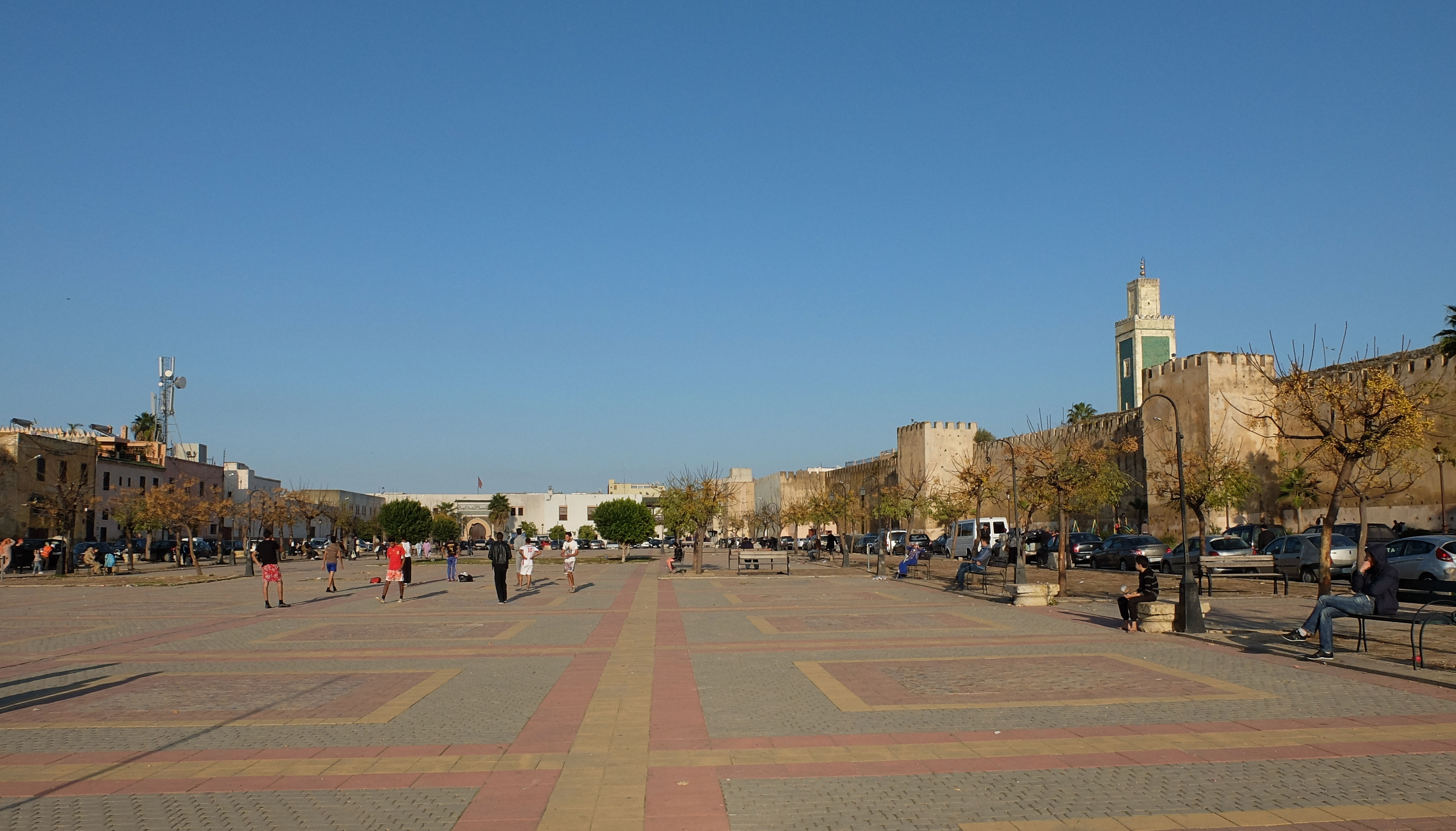
Place Lalla Aouda

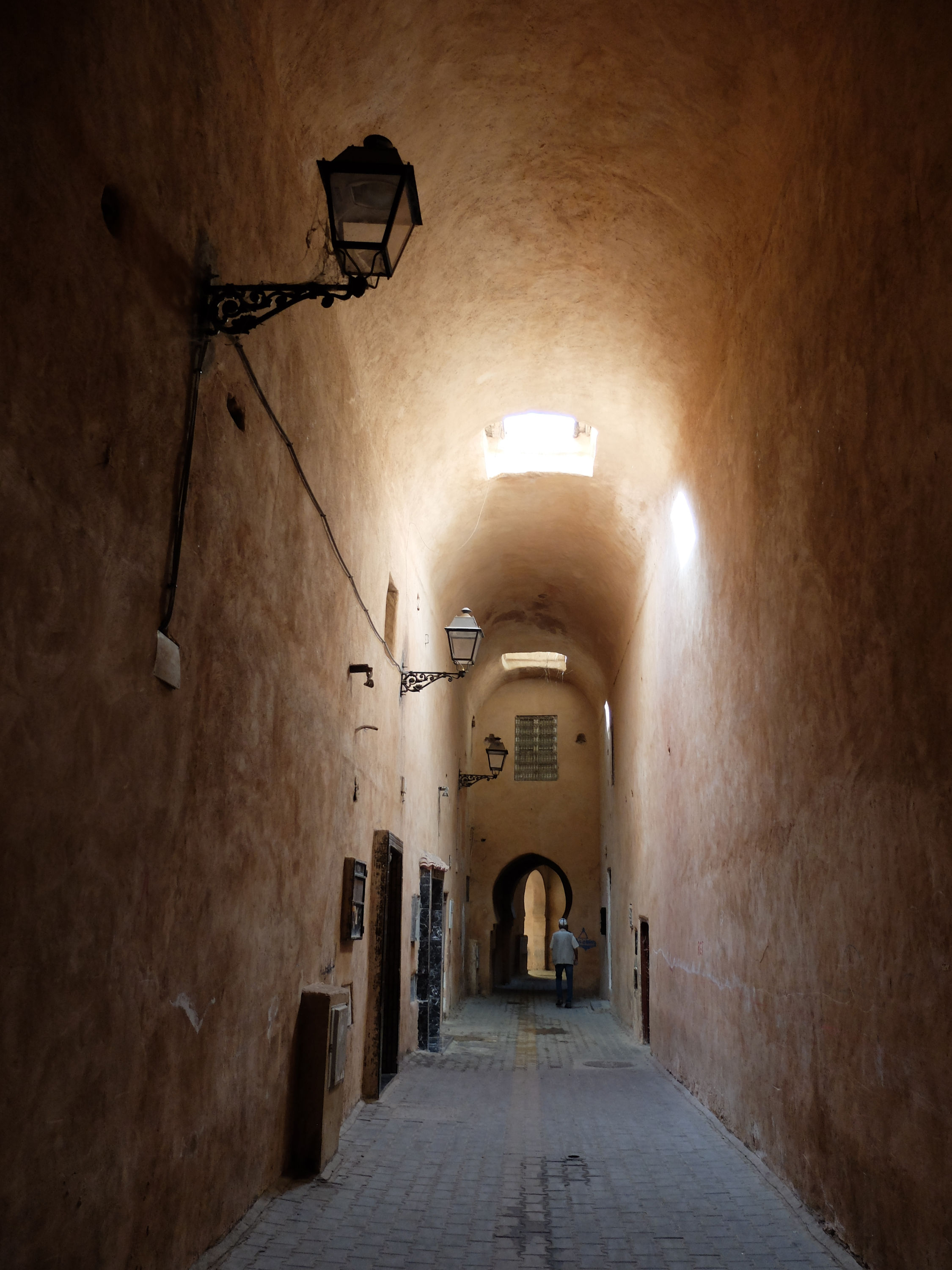
Vaulted passage in the palace ruins of the Dar el-Kebira neighbourhood

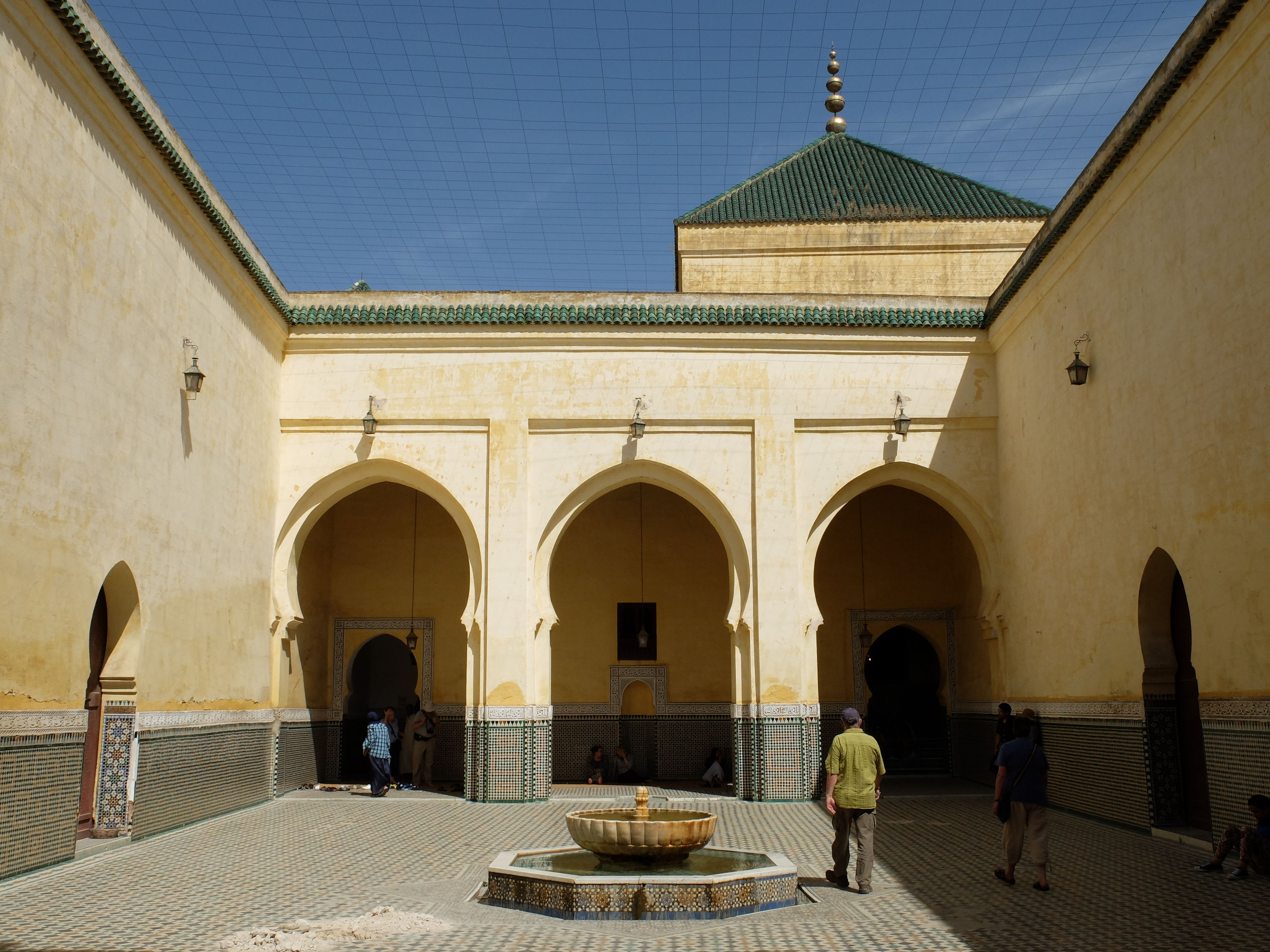
The Mausoleum complex of Moulay Isma'il

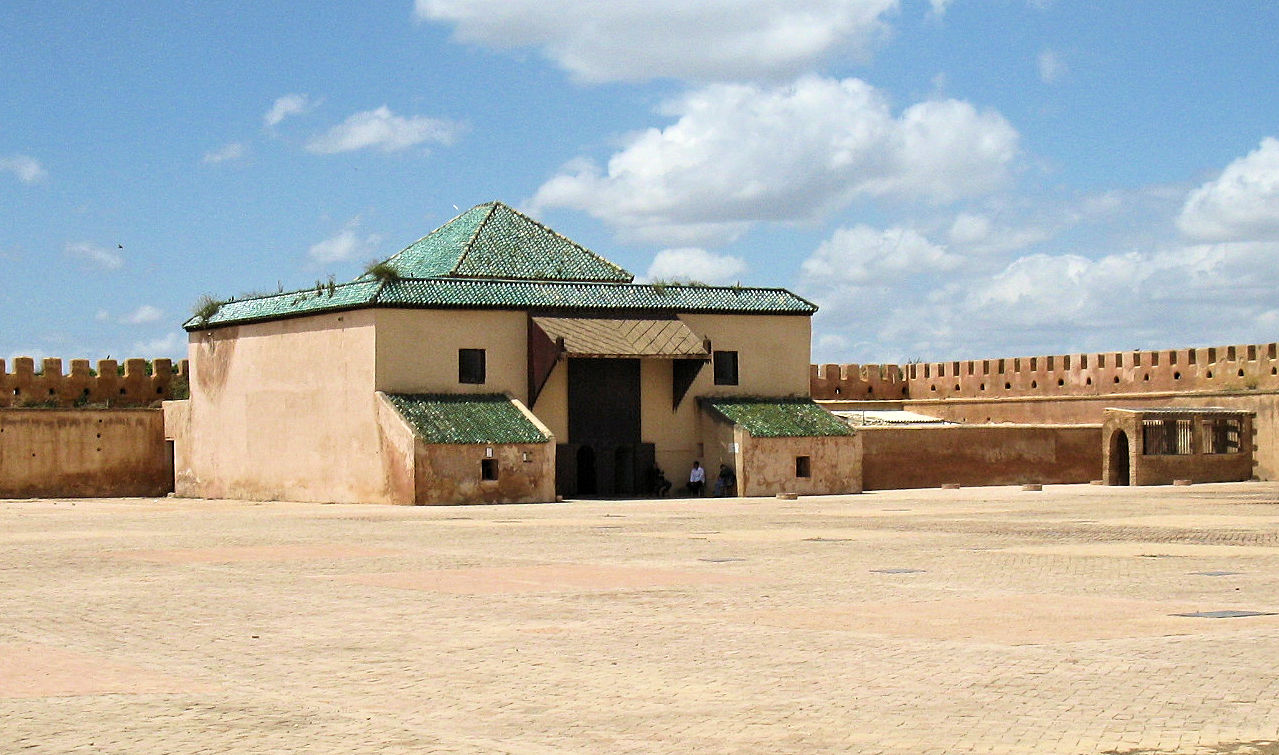
The Qubbat al-Khayyatin

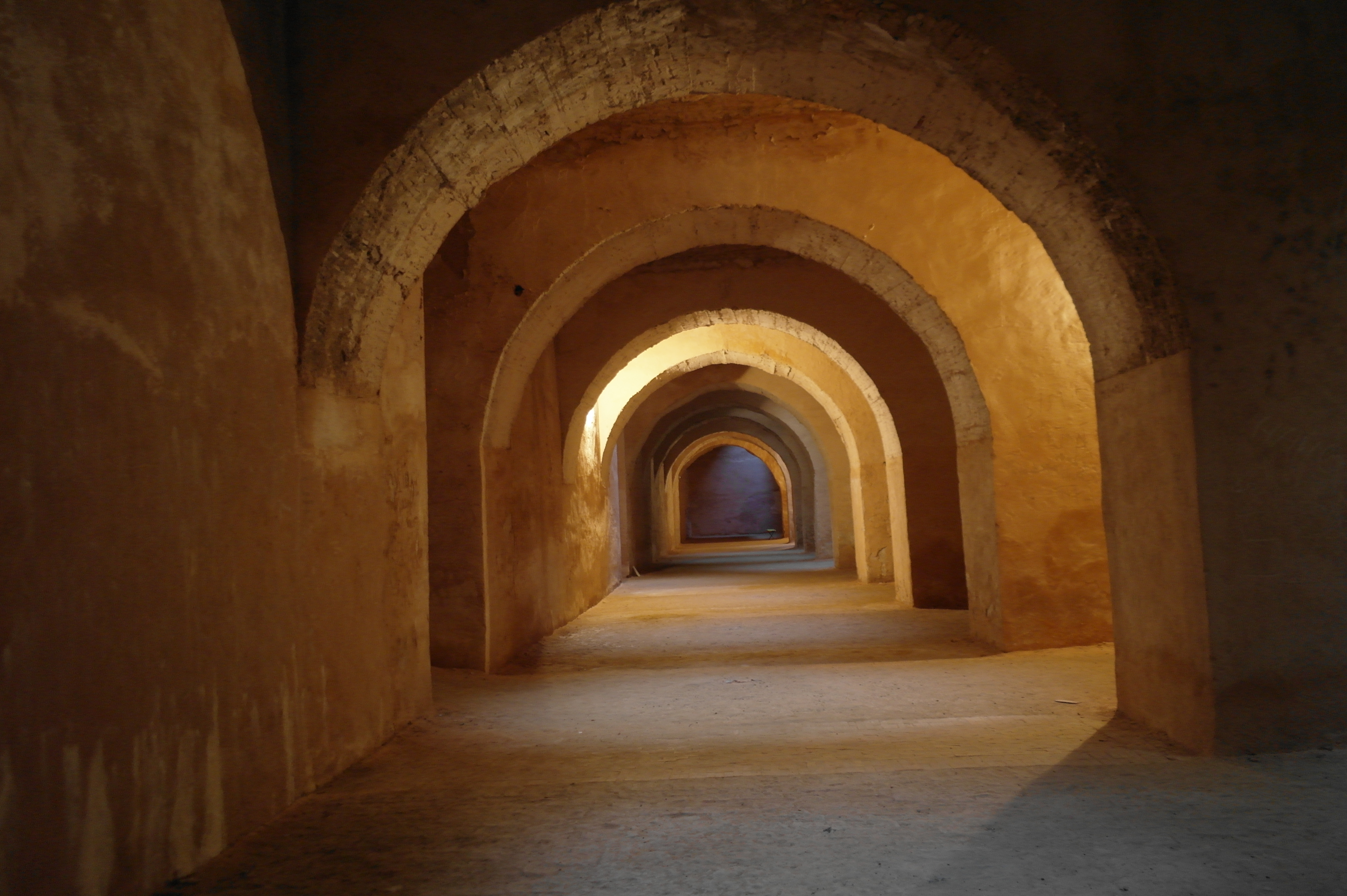
The Qara "Prison"

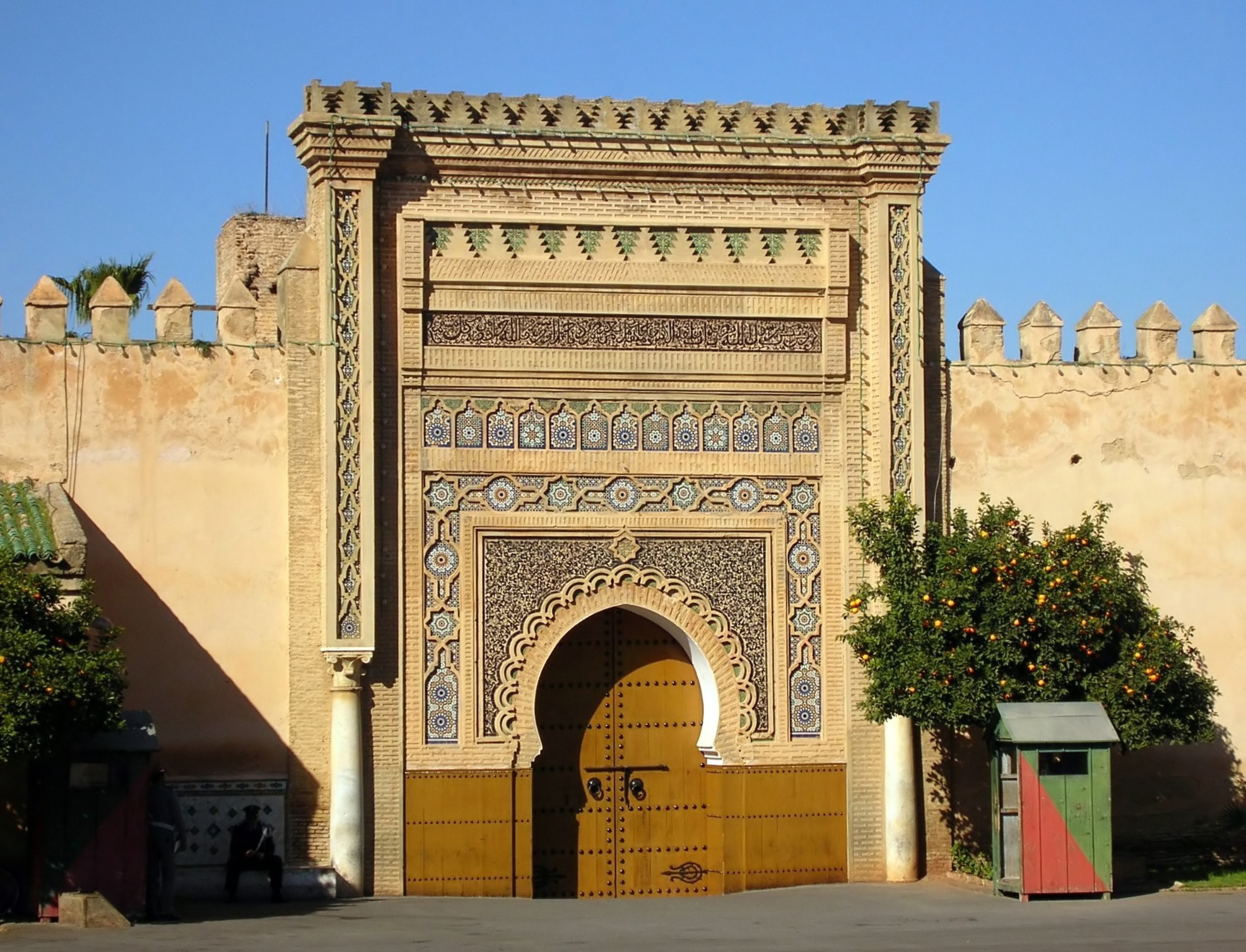
Ornate gate of the Dar al-Makhzen in Meknes

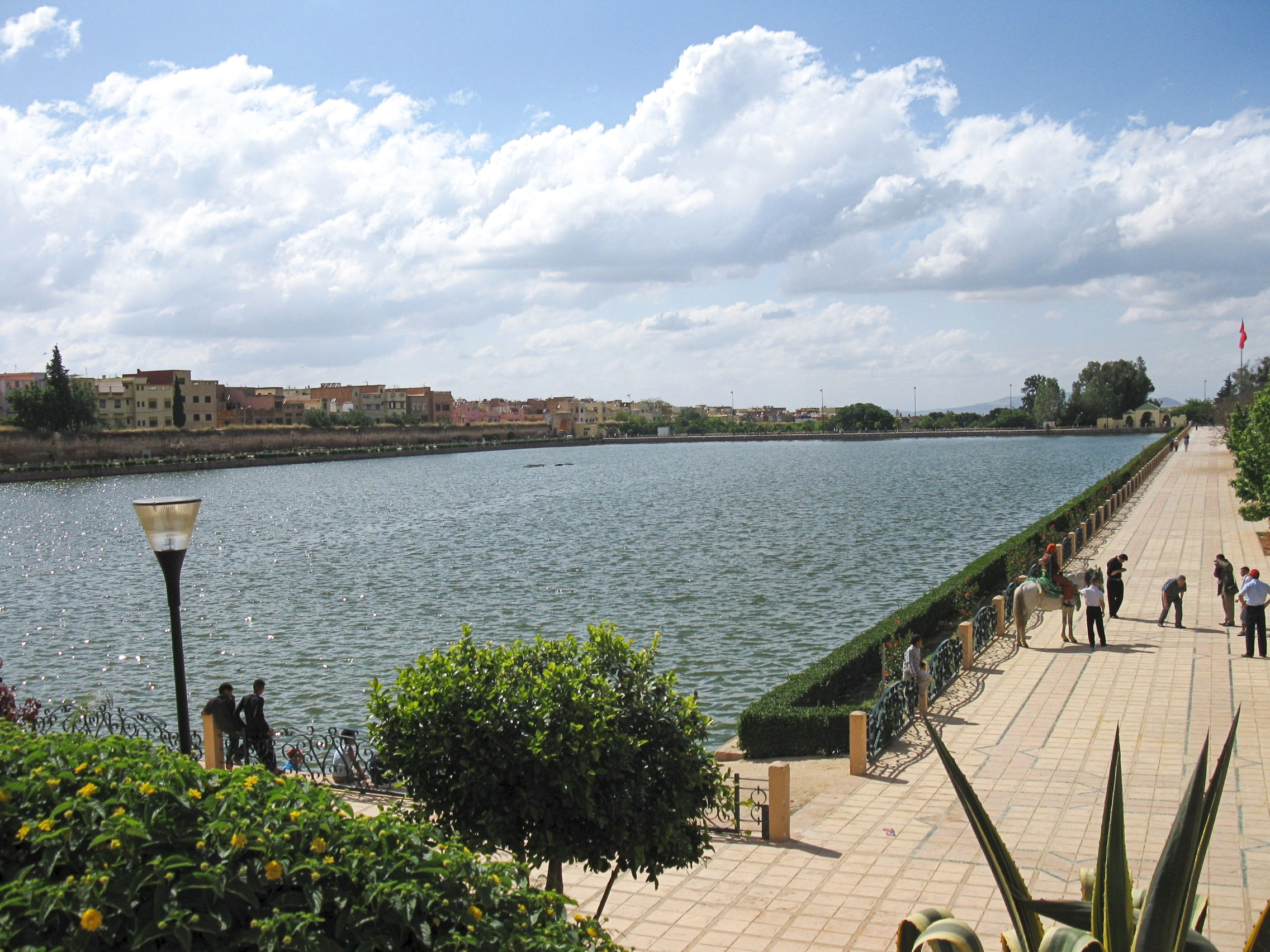
The Sahrij or Agdal Basin

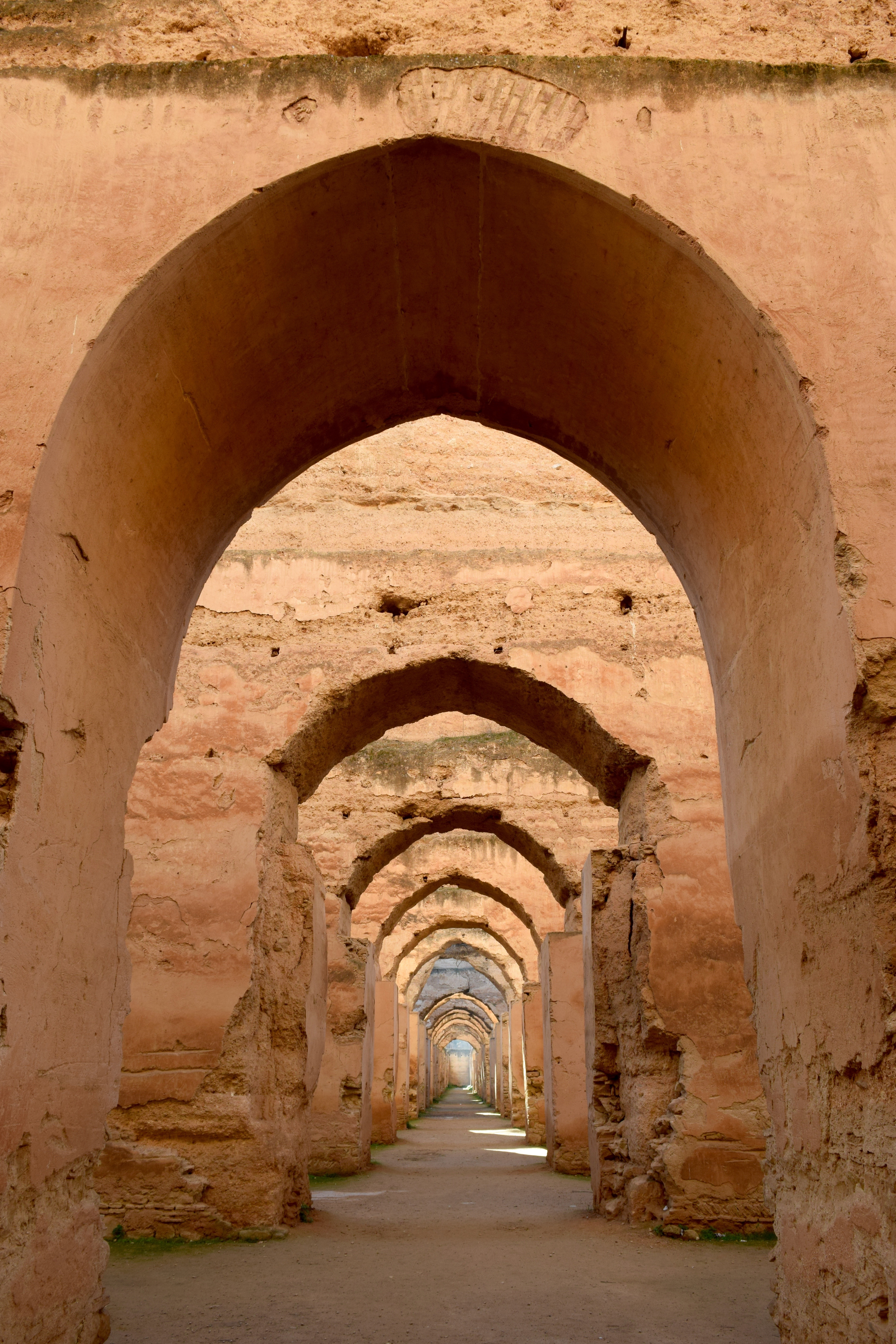
Arches of the Heri as-Swani silos

=== Synagogues ===
- The Rabbi Meir Toledano Synagogue still stands in Meknes today. According to tradition, it was first built in the 13th century and rebuilt by the Toledano family in 1646.
- The Etz Hayeem synagogue in Meknes is also a historical synagogue.

=== Museums ===
- Dar Jamaï Museum: The best-known museum in Meknes, housing a number of artifacts and art objects from the city and other regions in Morocco. It is housed in a late 19th-century palace with gardens and ornate rooms built in 1882 by Mokhtar ben Larbi Jamai, who served as Grand Vizier under Sultan Moulay Hassan (ruled 1873–1894). His family also built the Jamai Palace in Fes.
- Musée de Meknès (Meknes Museum): A small museum housed in a structure just northeast of Bab al-Mansur, exhibiting artifacts from all over Morocco.
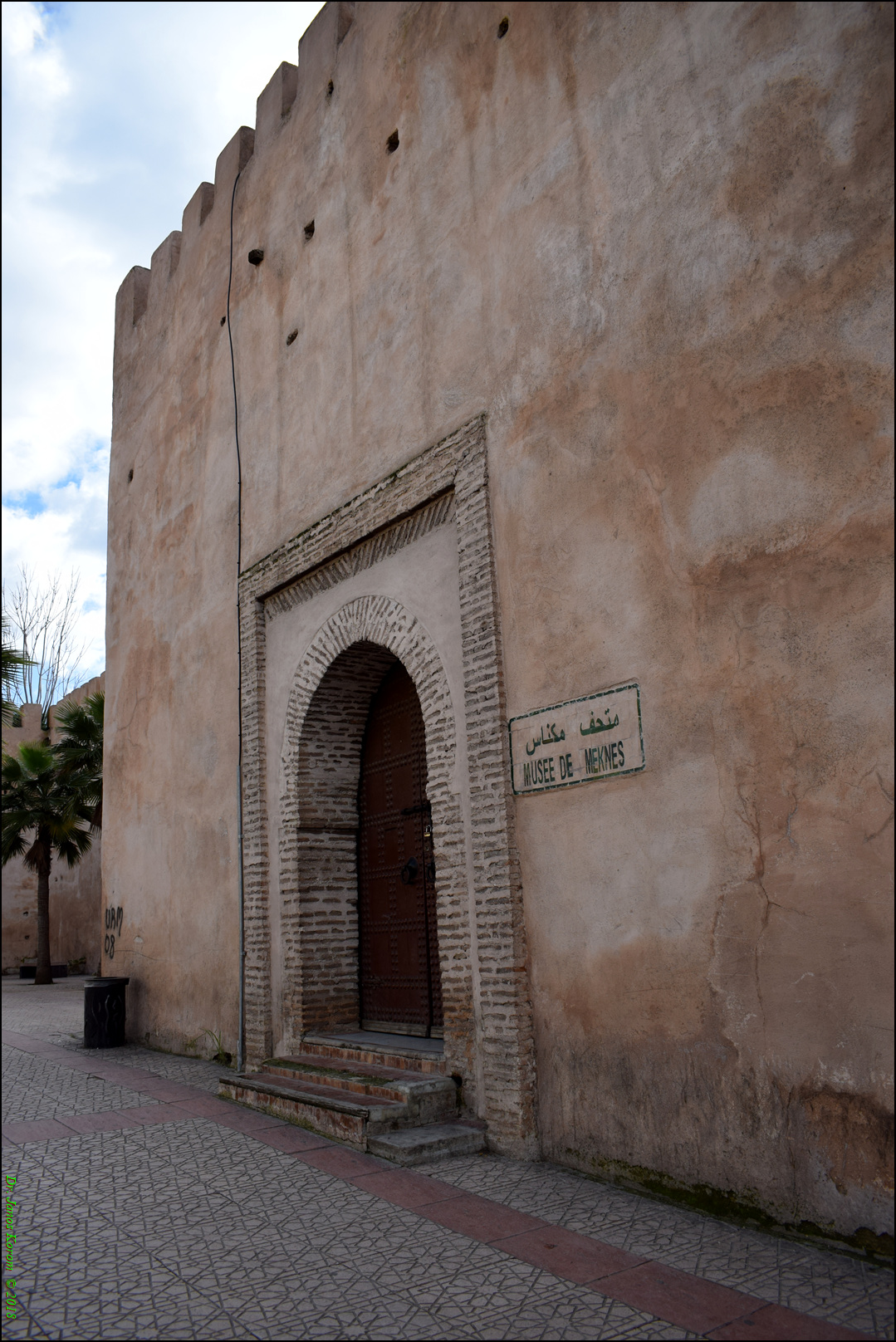
Entrance to the Meknes Museum

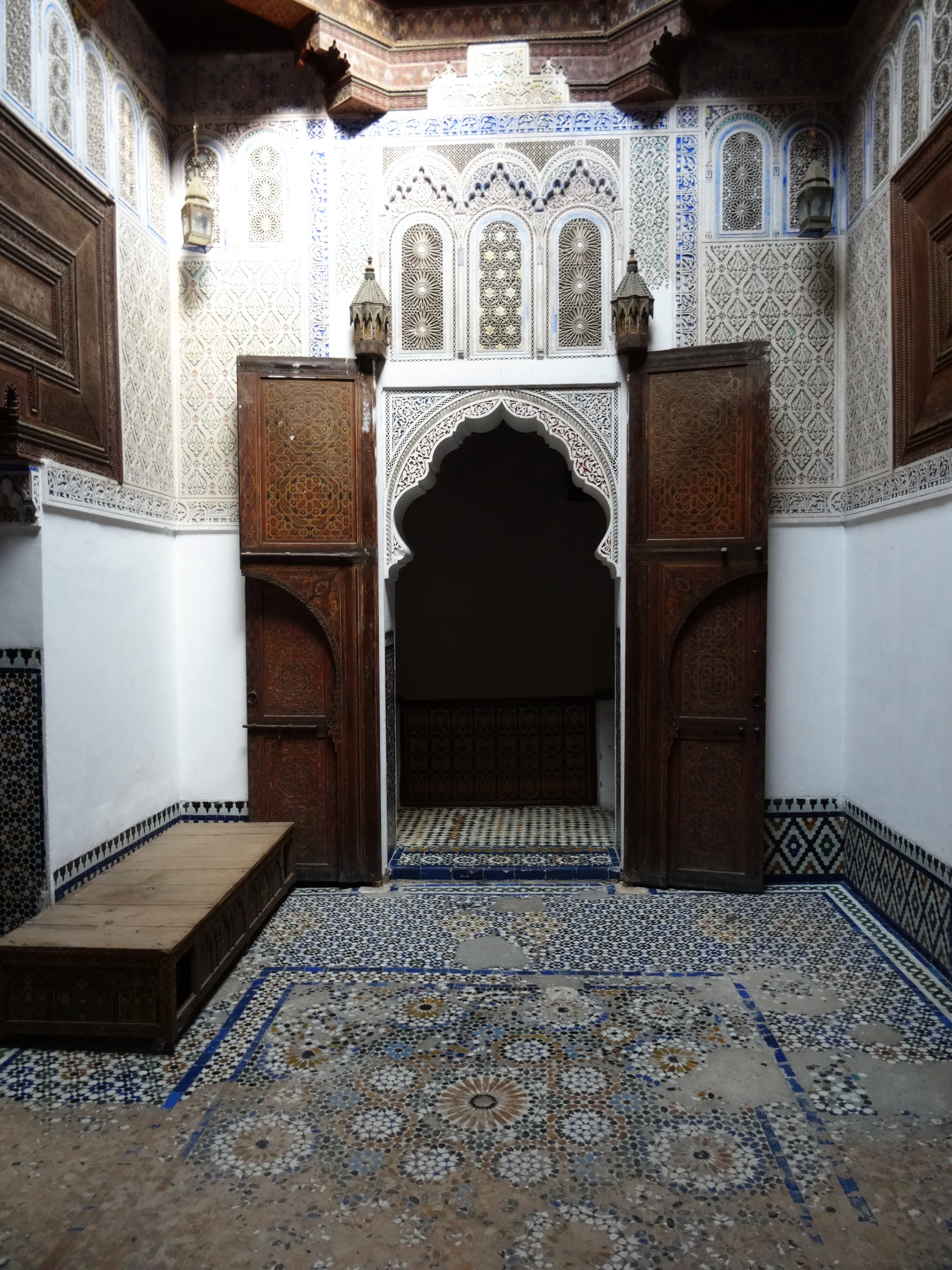
Room in the Dar Jamai Museum

=== Outlying sites ===
The ruins of the Roman town of Volubilis (Oualili), another UNESCO World Heritage Site, are about half an hour to the north, as is the village and important pilgrimage site of Moulay Idriss Zerhoun.

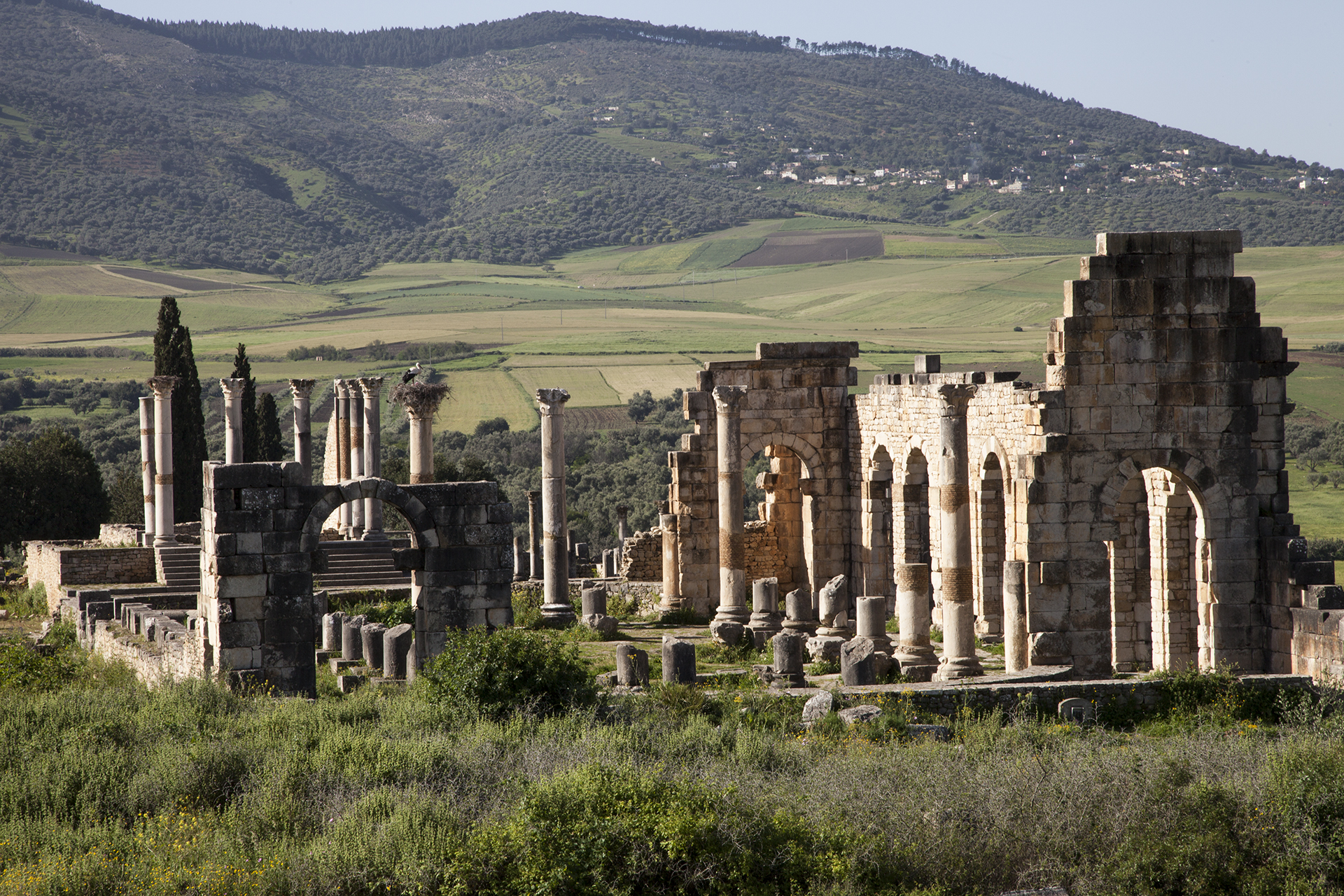
Ruins of Roman Volubilis

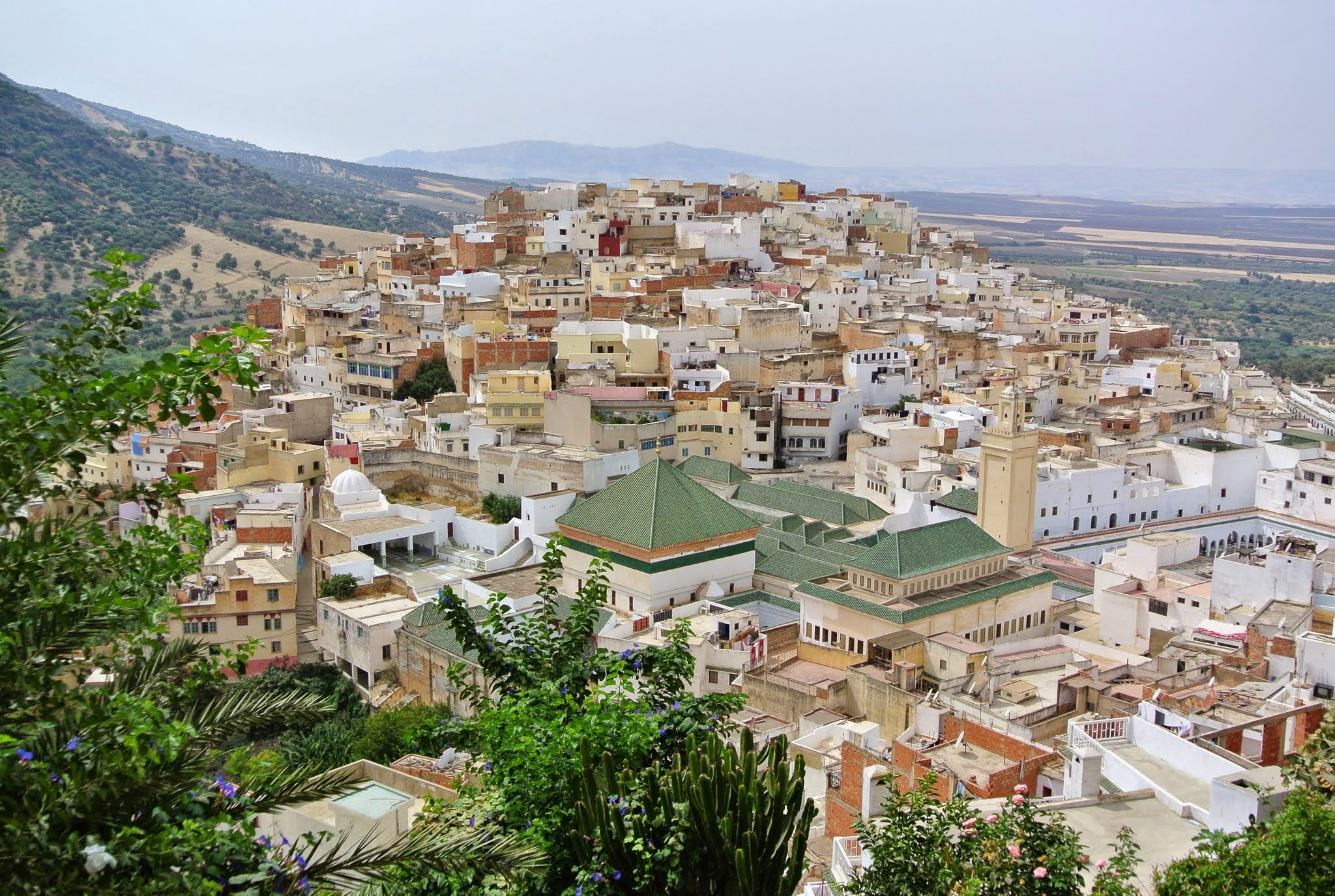
The town of Moulay Idriss Zerhoun

== Economy ==
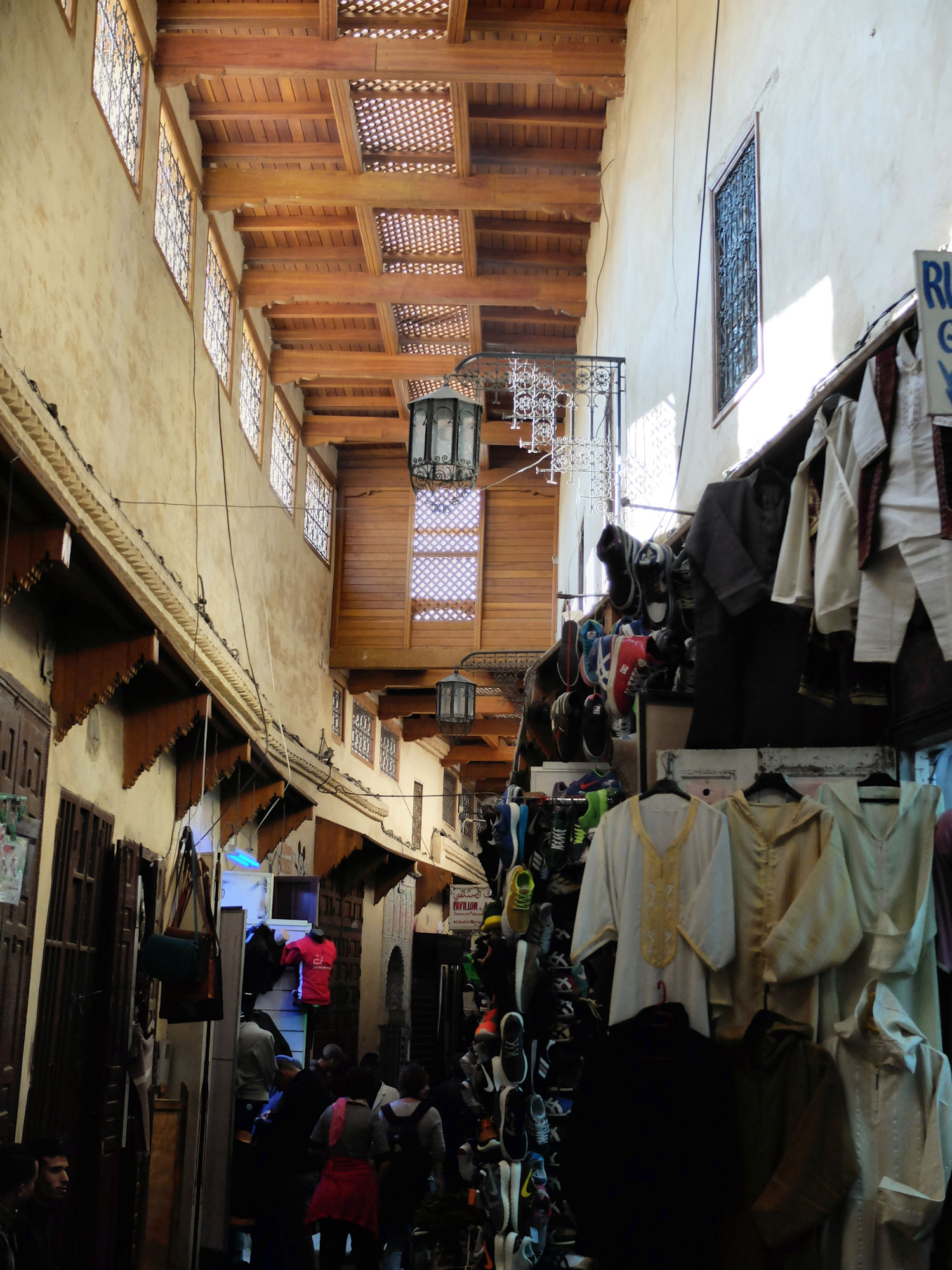
A traditional market street in the center of the medina (old city)

Meknes is an economic centre in Morocco with various products from three sectors (agriculture, industry and services), which makes the city economically competitive and attractive for investment.

=== Competitiveness ===
A December 2015 World Bank report classified Meknes as one of the three most competitive cities in Africa. Two of those three competitive African cities are Moroccan: Meknes and Tangier.

=== Agriculture ===
Meknes is considered to be the capital of agriculture in Morocco. Meknes is in the center of the Saïss plain, one of the most fertile and rich plains in Morocco

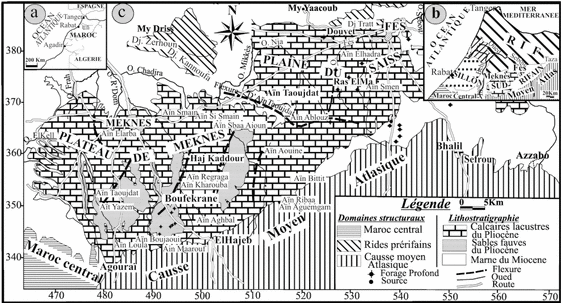
This image shows the geographical structure of the Saïss plain around Meknes area in Morocco.

Each year Meknes holds the International Agriculture Show in Morocco (French: Salon International de l'Agriculture au Maroc) since April 2006. This agriculture show has an area of more than 250000 square meters, with more than 60 countries participating, and more than 1200 exhibitors. The lands around Meknes area are known to be fertile and productive. The high elevation, fertility and the fresh water of those lands favor the cultivation of fruits and vegetables, most notably: peaches, nectarines, prunes, apples, potatoes, onions and garlic. Meknes is also known for its olives and olive oil. Livestock raising, particularly sheep and cattle, is widespread. Meknes has large industrial units for milk and dairy production that fulfill most of the needs of the region.

=== Industry ===
Industry in Meknes is of light type, most of it is related to food processing especially in the Commune of Mejjat, and chemical and para-chemical industry in other industrial zones like the Agropolis industrial and agribusiness zone. Add to those the textile and metallic manufacturing which are old industries in the city. The year 2016 marks a new era of industry in the city of Meknes; it includes electrical wire, embedded systems, and automotive parts production companies.

==== Major companies ====
Name	Year
Yazaki	March 2016
Delphi Automotive	2016
Lafarge Holcim	
Salidor	1993
Yura Corporation	2016

=== Services ===
Many of the services products in Meknes are related to tourism due to the attractions of the old city district (the medina).

== Transport ==
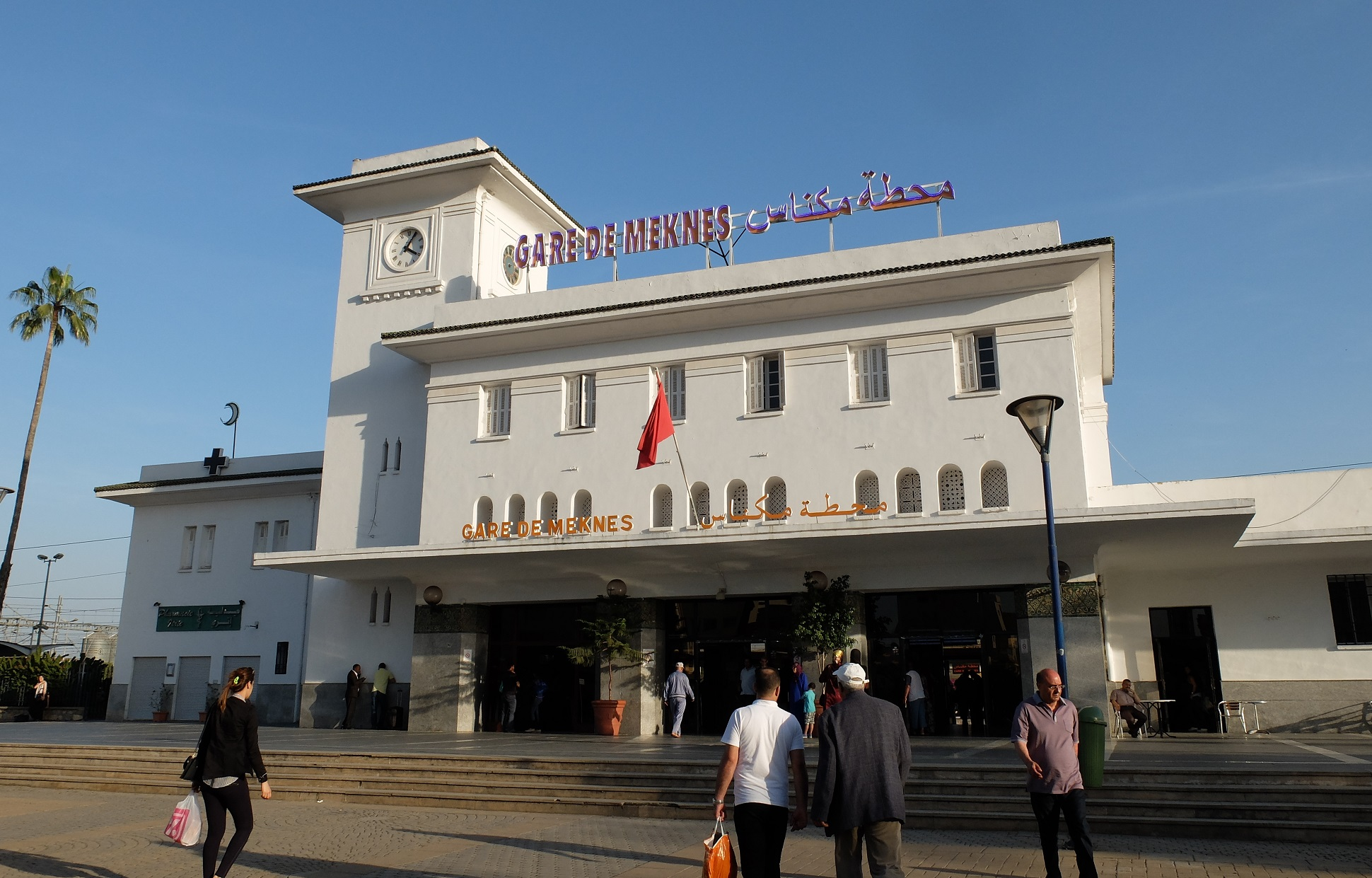
Meknès Ville train station

=== Road ===
The geographical location of the city of Meknes makes it one of the important transport hubs in Morocco. The city is accessed via the A2 expressway with two exits, one to the east of the city and another to the west.

The city's Gare Routière (intercity bus station) is located west of the medina, along with the main station for grand taxis (intercity taxis). A newer station for buses operated by CTM is located near the main railway station.

=== Rail ===
Two train stations are located in the new city district (French: Ville Nouvelle) of Meknes, with trains each hour to the east, west, and north of Morocco. One is larger than the other and serve a different purpose. Operated by ONCF, the following table lists destinations reachable via Meknes railway stations (round-trips):

Direction	Route	Frequency
West	Fez - Meknes - Kenitra - Rabat - Casa Voyageurs	Every 2 hours
West and South West	Fez - Meknes - Sidi Kacem - Sidi Slimane - Kenitra - Salé - Rabat - Mohammedia - Casa Ain-Sebaa - Casa Voyageurs - Casa Oasis - Berrechid - Settat - Ben Guerir - Marrakesh	Every 2 hours
North	Fez - Meknes - Sidi Kacem - Ksar el-Kebir - Tangier - Ksar es-Seghir	6 trains a day
East	Casa Voyageurs - Casa Ain-Sebaa - Mohammedia - Rabat - Salé - Kenitra - Sidi Slimane - Sidi Kacem - Meknes - Fez - Taza - Guercif - Taourirt - Oujda	Two trains a day
West	Meknes - Sidi Kacem - Sidi Slimane - Kenitra - Salé - Rabat - Mohammedia - Casa Ain-Sebaa - Casa Port	3 trains every Sunday PM

As mentioned above, Meknes city has two train stations, and their names are: Meknes Railway Station (French: Gare de Meknès) and Meknes Amir Abdul Qadir Railway Station (French: Gare de Meknès Amir Abdelkader). All the mentioned trains cited in the previous table stop by the former station; and except the first row of the table, all the remaining trains stop by the latter station.

=== Air ===
The nearest airport is Fes-Saïss Airport (IATA: FEZ, ICAO: GMFF) accessible only by road transport.

Otherwise, Mohammed V Airport in Casablanca, with more international flights and destinations, is conveniently accessible by train.

There is also a military airport in Meknes.

=== Public Transport ===
Public transport in Meknes is managed by the urban commune and it consists of:

- A large network of buses that cover all the area of the prefecture, and even outside of the prefecture like the line 16 to El Hajeb.
- Taxis in the city exist in two types: small taxis with 3 places Max that work with fares system; and bigger taxis with 6 places Max that have a predetermined trajectory and fixed prices.

== Education ==
National School of Agriculture of Meknes

Meknes is home to the public Moulay Ismail University, with actually the following faculties, schools and institutions divided among three campuses in the cities: Meknes, Errachidia and Khenifra.

In Meknes:

- Faculty of Sciences - FS, created in 1982
- Faculty of Letters and Human Sciences - FLSH, created in 1982
- Normal Superior School - ENS, created in 1983
- Faculty of Juridical, Economical and Social Sciences - FSJES, created in 1993
- Superior School of Technology - EST, created in 1993
- National Superior School of the Arts and Professions - ENSAM, created in 1997

In Errachidia:

- Faculty of Science and Technology - FST, created in 1994
- Poly disciplinary Faculty - FP, created in 2006

In Khenifra:

- Superior School of Technology - EST, created in 2014

In addition to Moulay Ismail University, numerous private institutes for higher education exist in Meknes.

== International relations ==
See also List of twin towns and sister cities in Morocco

=== Twin towns – Sister cities ===
Meknes is twinned with:

- Cenon, France, since 2017
- Nîmes, France, since 2005
- Santarém, Portugal, since 1989
- Tulkarm, Palestine, since 2017

== Notable people ==
- Abdeljalil Hadda, former international Moroccan footballer
- Aryeh Deri, Moroccan-born Israeli politician
- Aziza Jalal, Arabic pop singer and actress
- Driss Roukhe, Moroccan actor and director
- Faouzi Bensaïdi, Moroccan actor and film director
- Khalid Ismail, Moroccan MMA fighter
- H-Kayne, hip-hop group
- Houcine Toulali, Moroccan Malhun singer and writer
- Karima Abd-Daif, Moroccan-Norwegian politician
- Laïla Abid, Dutch journalist and news presenter
- Latefa Ahrar, Moroccan actress
- Malika Akkaoui, Moroccan athlete
- Kaddour El Alamy, Moroccan poet
- Chuck Martini (born Choukri Moussaddik), former Moroccan footballer
- Muhammad Al Barka, writer and historian
- Mickaël Pariente, author
- Cut Killer, DJ and record producer
- Sara Chafak, a Finnish beauty pageant of Moroccan origins, Miss Finland 2012
- Salah Eddine El Ghomari, journalist and television presenter
- Farid al-Ansari, religious scholar and writer
