= Kasbah of Moulay Ismail =

Historic palace complex in Meknes, Morocco

Kasbah of Moulay Isma'il
- قصبة المولى إسماعيل (Arabic)
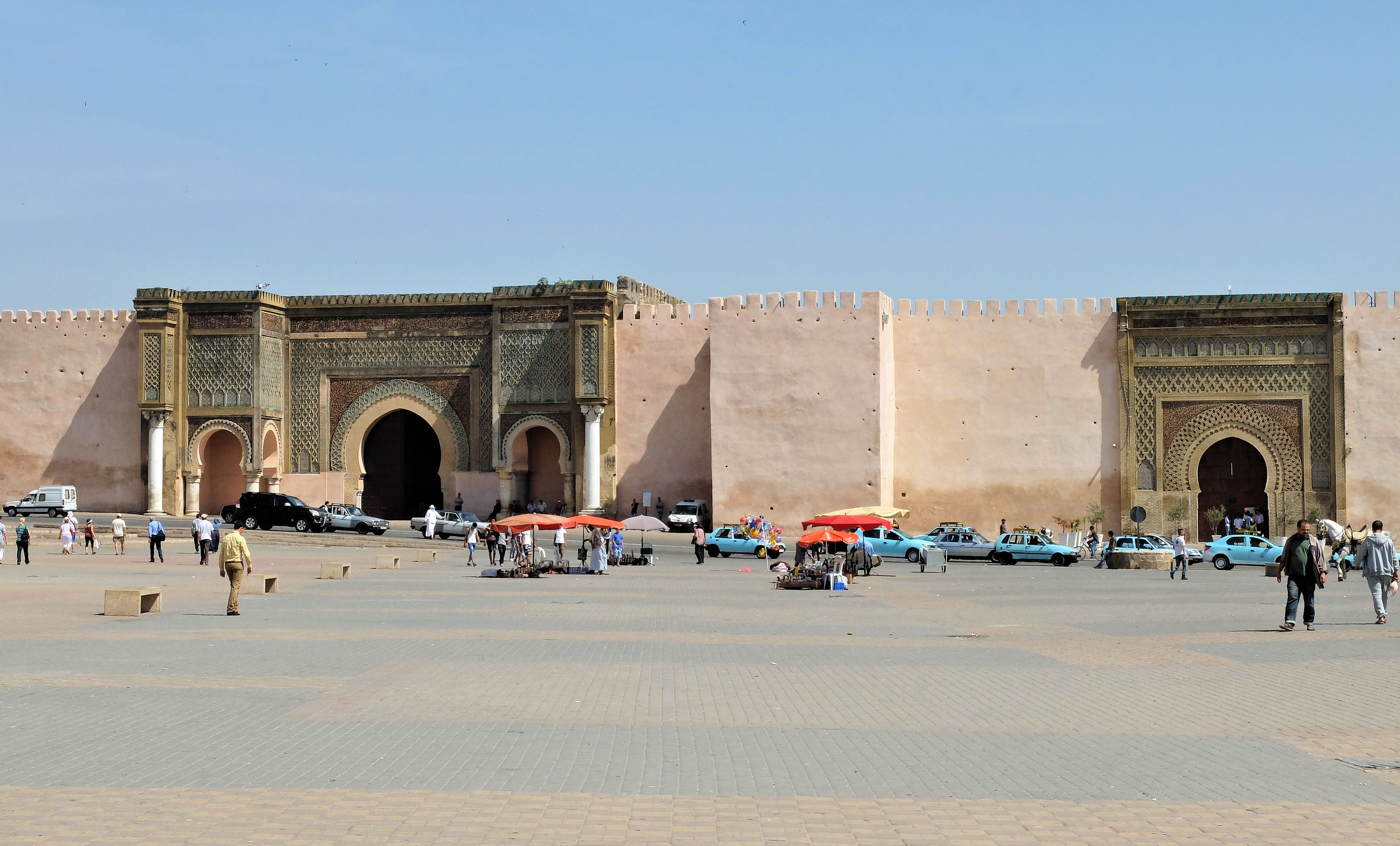
- The monumental entrance gates of the Kasbah: Bab al-Mansur (left) and Bab Jama' an-Nouar (right).
- Interactive map of Kasbah of Moulay Isma'il
- 33°52′59″N 5°33′30″W
- Type: citadel, palace complex
- Location: Meknes, Morocco

History
- Founded: 1672
- Founder: Sultan Moulay Isma'il ibn Sharif
- Built: 1672–1732, minor additions between 1757 and 1790

Site notes
- Architectural style: Moroccan

UNESCO World Heritage Site
- Type: Cultural
- Criteria: iv
- Designated: 1996
- Part of: Historic City of Meknes
- Reference no.: 793
- Region: Africa

The Kasbah of Moulay Ismail is a vast palace complex and royal kasbah (citadel) built by the Moroccan sultan Moulay Isma'il ibn Sharif (also spelled "Ismail") in Meknes, Morocco. It is also known, among other names, as the Imperial City (French: Ville Impériale) or Palace of Moulay Ismail, or the Kasbah of Meknes. It was built by Moulay Isma'il over the many decades of his reign between 1672 and 1727, when he made Meknes the capital of Morocco, and received occasional additions under later sultans.

In addition to Moulay Isma'il's own importance in the history of Morocco, his imperial palace in Meknes was notable for its vast scale and its complex infrastructure. The area covered by the kasbah was significantly larger than the old city of Meknes itself and operated as its own city with its own fortifications, water supply, food stockpiles, and troops. Historians later nicknamed it the "Moroccan Versailles". Today, many of the buildings from Moulay Isma'il's era have disappeared or fallen into ruin, but some notable monumental structures remain. A part of the area, the Dar al-Makhzen, is still in use as an occasional royal residence of the King of Morocco, while other sections of the complex have been converted to other functions or replaced with general residential neighbourhoods.

== History ==
=== Historical context ===
The kasbah of Meknes was first created on this site by the Marinid sultan Abu Yusuf Ya'qub in 1276 CE; the same year that the citadel of Fes el-Jdid was built in nearby Fes as the new capital of the Marinid empire. (Though some sources also cite a kasbah existing near or on the site of Place el-Hedim since the Almoravid period.) During this period, Meknes was frequently the residence of Marinid princes (appointed there as governors) and especially of viziers. The Mosque of the Kasbah (the later Mosque of Lalla Aouda) was also founded and first built in 1276. After the end of the Marinid period, however, Meknes suffered from neglect as the new Saadian dynasty (16th and early 17th century) focused their attention on their capital at Marrakesh.

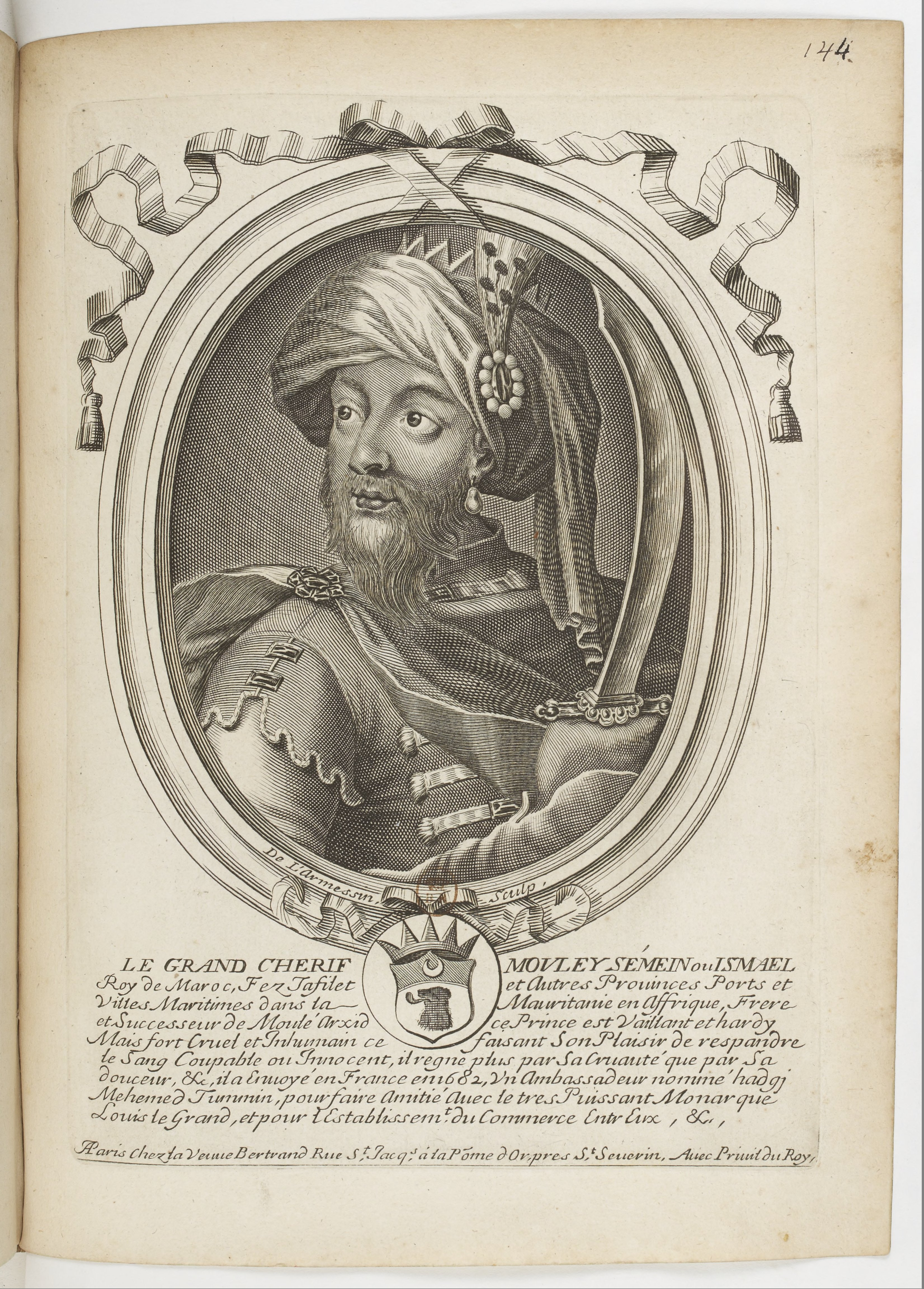
A portrait of Moulay Isma'il in a French manuscript from 1690

It wasn't until the Alaouite dynasty in the second half of the 17th century that Meknes received renewed attention. Under Moulay Rashid (ruled 1666–1672), the first Alaouite sultan to unite Morocco under his rule, Fes became the capital once more and his brother, Moulay Isma'il ibn Sharif, governed Meknes. Upon Rashid's death in 1672, Moulay Isma'il became sultan and chose Meknes as his capital. As sultan, Isma'il's 55-year reign was one of longest in Moroccan history. He distinguished himself as a ruler who wished to establish a unified Moroccan state as the absolute authority in the land, independent of any particular group within Morocco – in contrast to previous dynasties which relied on certain tribes or regions as the base of their power. He succeeded in part by creating a new army composed of Black slaves (the 'Abid al-Bukhari) from Sub-Saharan Africa (or descendants of previously imported slaves), many of them Muslims, whose loyalty was to him alone. Isma'il himself was half Black, his mother having been a Black slave. He also continuously led military campaigns against rebels, rivals, and European positions along the Moroccan coast. In practice, he still had to rely on various groups to control outlying areas, but he nonetheless succeeded in retaking many coastal cities occupied by England and Spain and managed to enforce order and heavy taxation throughout his territories. He put a definitive end to Ottoman attempts to gain influence in Morocco and established Morocco on more equal diplomatic footing with European powers in part by forcing them to ransom Christian captives at his court. These Christians were mostly captured by Moroccan pirate fleets which he heavily sponsored as a means of both revenue and warfare. While in captivity, prisoners were often forced into labour on his construction projects. All of these activities and policies gave him a reputation for ruthlessness and cruelty among European writers and a mixed reputation among Moroccan historians as well, though he is credited with unifying Morocco under strong (but brutal) leadership.

In addition to any attachment to the city he had previously acquired as its governor, a number of reasons may have pushed Isma'il to choose Meknes as his capital. One may have been the fact that Ismail had to fight hard to reconquer both Fes and Marrakesh from his rival nephew (Ahmad al-Mahriz, son of Moulay Rashid) during the first years of his reign, which may have rendered him skeptical towards both cities as possible centers of power. Moreover, Moulay Rashid had garrisoned much of Fes with his own contingents from the Tafilalt and eastern Morocco while Moulay Isma'il was forming his own personal royal regiments composed of Black slaves, and there may have been concerns that not all these contingents could be garrisoned simultaneously in Fes. The ulema (religious scholars) of Fes were also particularly disapproving of his ways, including his use of slaves (many of whom were of Muslim background), and maintained tense relations with him throughout his reign. Choosing Meknes thus removed him from the influence of traditional elites and allowed him to build a fresh base from which he hoped to exercise absolute power. The threat of Ottoman attacks from the east (from Algeria) and the increasing insecurity in central Morocco due to tribal migrations from the Atlas and Sahara regions may have also persuaded Ismail that Meknes, situated further west, was more defensible than Fes.

=== Construction under Moulay Isma'il (1672–1727) ===
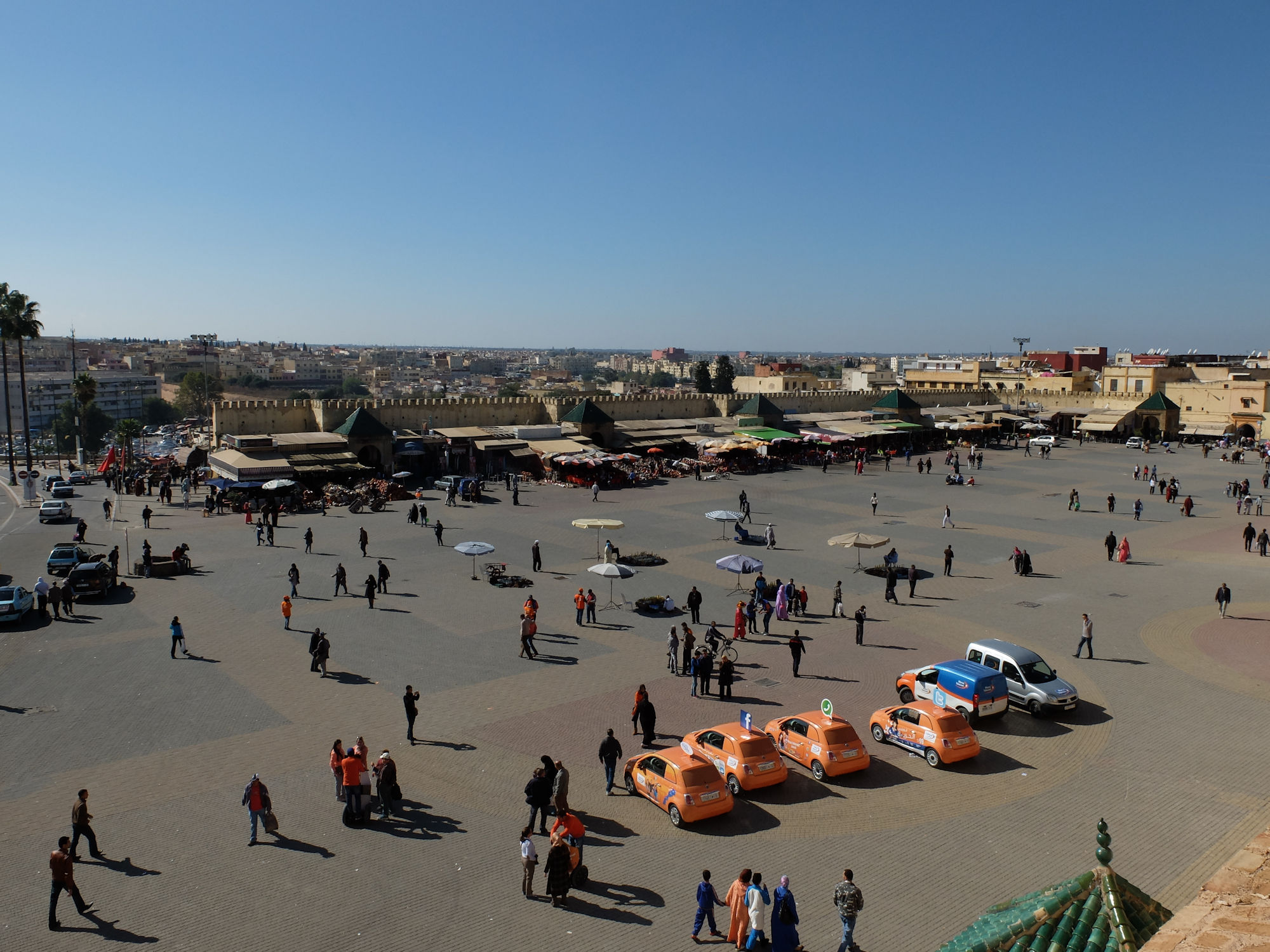
Place El Hedim (El Hedim Square) today

Whatever the reasons, Ismail made Meknes the center of Morocco in his time and construction on a new monumental palace-city continued throughout the 55 years of his reign. Work on the vast palace complex began as soon as his accession to the throne in 1672. Existing structures dating from the earlier medieval kasbah of the city were demolished to make way; the name of the large public square in front of the Kasbah today, el-Hedim (or Place el-Hedim), means "the rubble" and came from the masses of rubble and debris which were piled here during the demolition. This clearing of space also allowed for the sultan to leave an empty buffer zone between the kasbah's walls and the city, making them more defensible. It was also in Moulay Ismail's reign that the Jewish inhabitants of the city were moved to a new Mellah or Jewish district to the west, near the kasbah, not unlike the Mellah of Fes or that of Marrakesh. Moulay Isma'il also undertook works throughout the old city too by renovating mosques, refortifying the walls, and building new city gates (e.g. Bab Berda'in and Bab Khemis).

Labour was carried out by paid workers as well as by contingents of slaves, particularly Christian prisoners. Estimates on the total number of workers involved range from 25,000 and 55,000. Nonetheless, frequently-told stories about the tens of thousands of Christian slaves used for labour and the large underground dungeons where they were kept are somewhat exaggerated and originate from the accounts of European ambassadors who visited Isma'il's court (often to negotiate the release of prisoners from their countries). In reality, the number of Christian slaves was likely closer to a few thousand at most and the chambers popularly called "prisons" were actually storage rooms for grain and supplies. Marianne Barrucand, in her study of Moulay Isma'il's construction projects, cites earlier research that estimates the number of Christian slaves in the first half of Isma'il's reign between 550 and 650, and at around 800 in 1708.

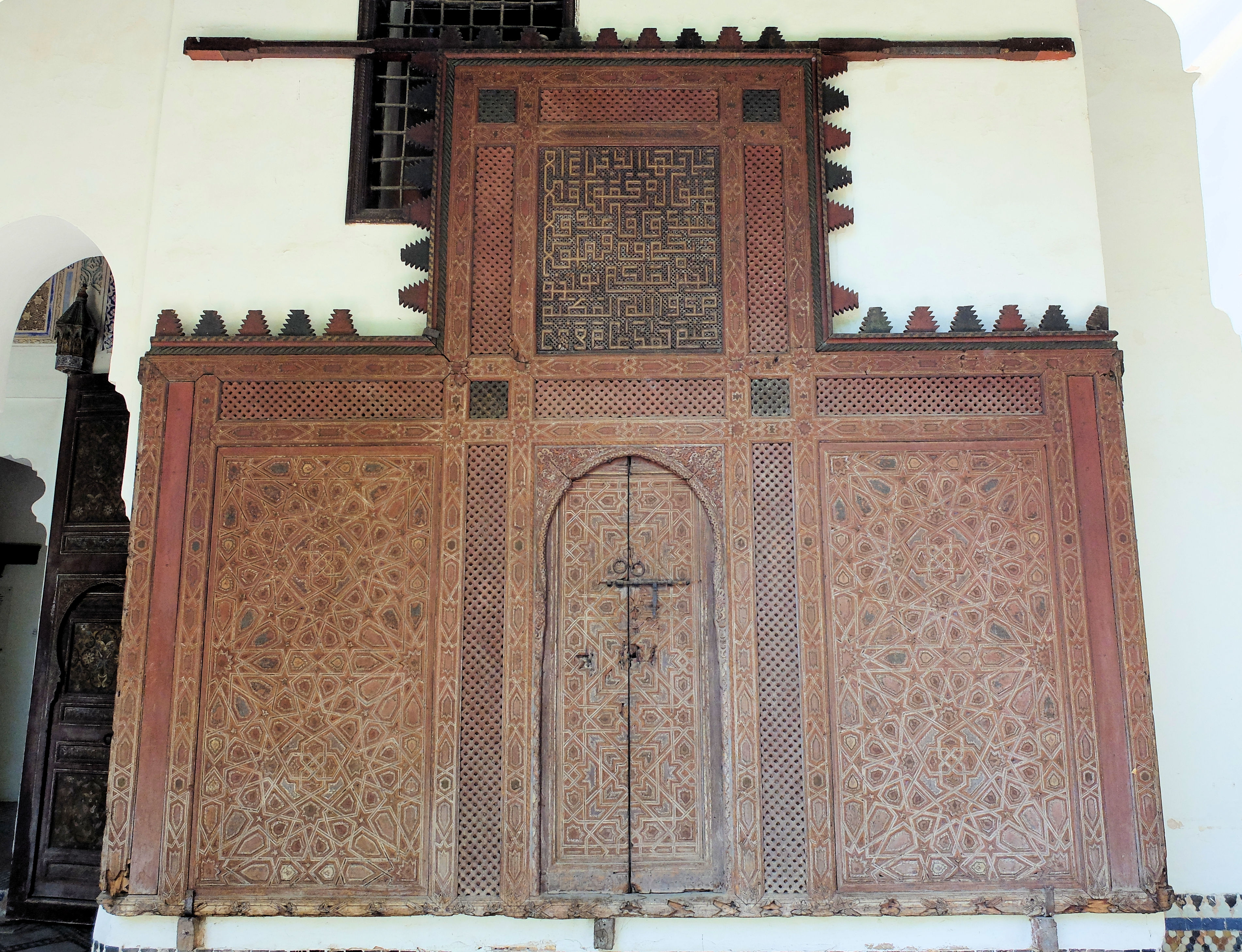
The maqsura of the Lalla Aouda Mosque, dating from Moulay Isma'il's time (now on display at the Dar Jamai Museum in Meknes)

The first component to be built was the Dar al-Kebira, the private palace of the sultan and his family, located on the site of the earlier kasbah of the city. It was finished in 1679. The kasbah's main mosque, now known as the Lalla Aouda Mosque, was also renovated or rebuilt, possibly around 1677. Moulay Isma'il chose the nearby tomb of a local saint, Sidi Abd ar-Rahman al-Majdoub, as the site of a new mausoleum that he founded for himself. New structures were added or expanded to the kasbah throughout his reign. One of the last constructions before his death, carried out between 1721 and 1725, was the Heri al-Mansur, a palace on the far southern edge of the kasbah (still partly preserved today) which included vast stables. The monumental gate known as Bab Mansur al-'Alj (or Bab Mansour), still preserved today overlooking Place al-Hedim, was only finished in 1732 by his son Moulay Abdallah. His other son and brief successor, Moulay Ahmad ad-Dhahabi, carried out modifications on Isma'il's mausoleum during his two brief reigns (in 1727–28 and 1728–29) and was himself buried here in 1729.

=== After Moulay Isma'il ===
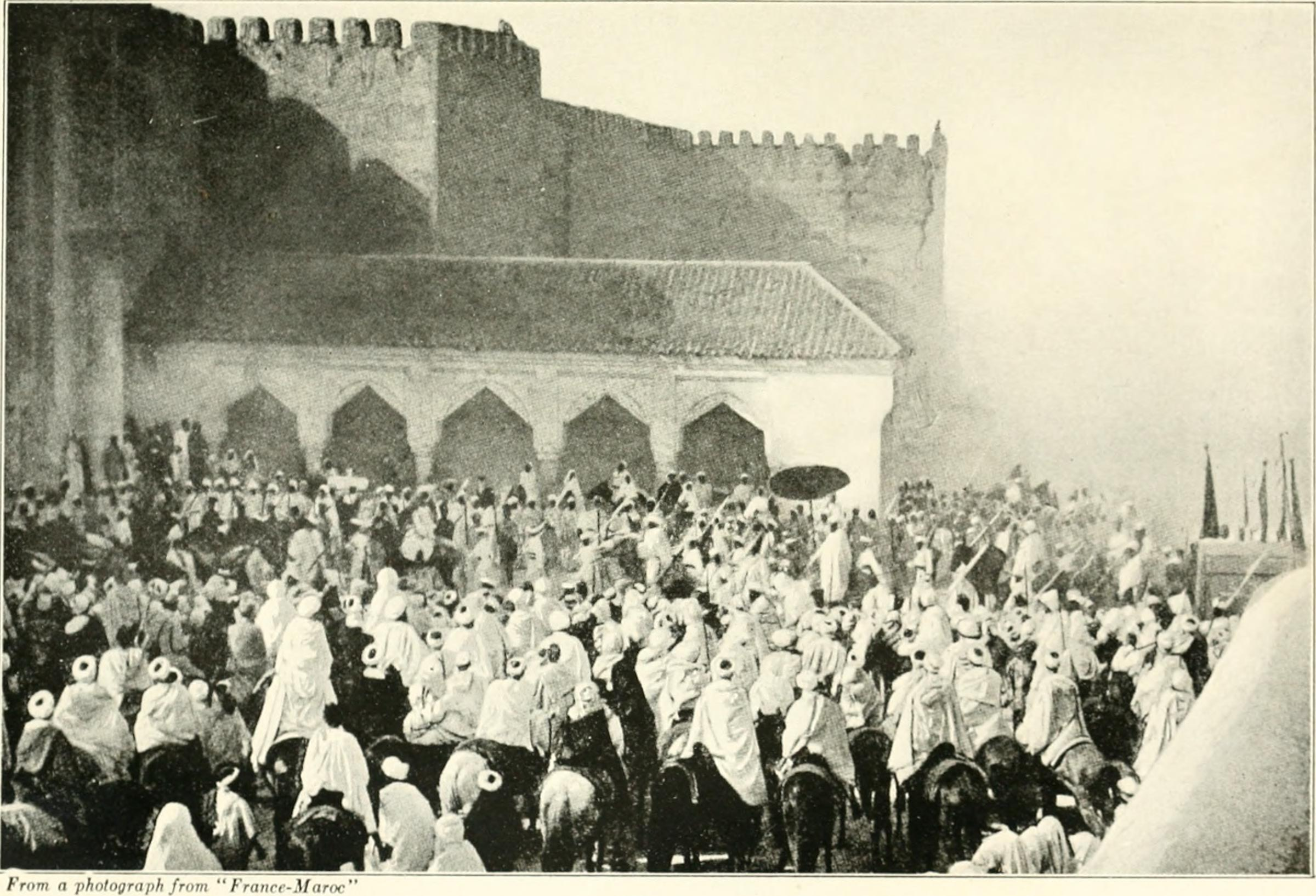
Royal ceremony taking place in front of Bab Mansour in 1920, with Moulay Abd ar-Rahman's 19th-century loggia visible in the back

Following Moulay Isma'il's death, however, the political situation in Morocco degenerated into relative anarchy. His sons fought each other for power and his former 'abid army became the dominant power in the state, effectively ruling behind the throne. Meknes lost its status as capital and suffered damage in the 1755 earthquake. The city was neglected and many parts of the enormous imperial kasbah fell into disrepair. The site received only occasional royal attention in the following centuries. Sultan Muhammad ibn Abdallah, who ruled between 1757 and 1790, added the Dar al-Bayda Palace in the Agdal garden to the southeast of the main palace complex, which was later turned into a royal military academy. He also constructed the Er-Roua Mosque in the southern part of the kasbah (not far from the Heri al-Mansur), which is the largest mosque in Meknes. The Dar al-Kebira, however, was abandoned and progressively transformed into a residential neighbourhood where the inhabitants constructed their houses within and between the former palace structures of Isma'il's time. In the early 19th century, Sultan Moulay Abd ar-Rahman added a loggia structure in front of Bab al-Mansur which served as a meeting place for ceremonies and the governor's tribunal, though this structure was later removed.

Today, a part of the kasbah, the Dar al-Makhzen, is still used by the King of Morocco and is off-limits to the public. Other sites, such as Moulay Isma'il's mausoleum and the Heri es-Souani, are open as religious sites or tourist attractions.

== Design and layout ==
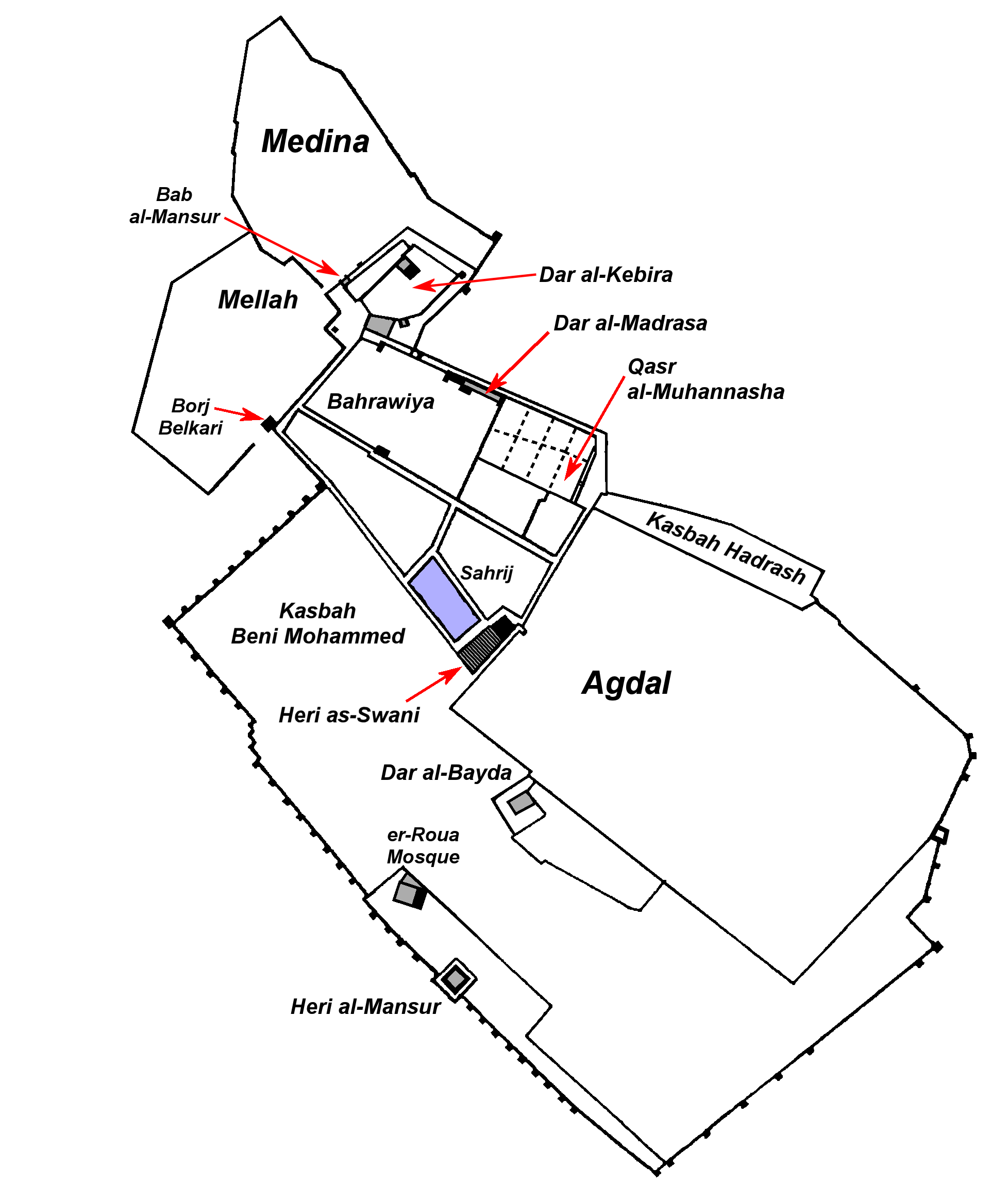
Map of the Kasbah of Moulay Ismail, relative to the old city (medina), with notable areas indicated

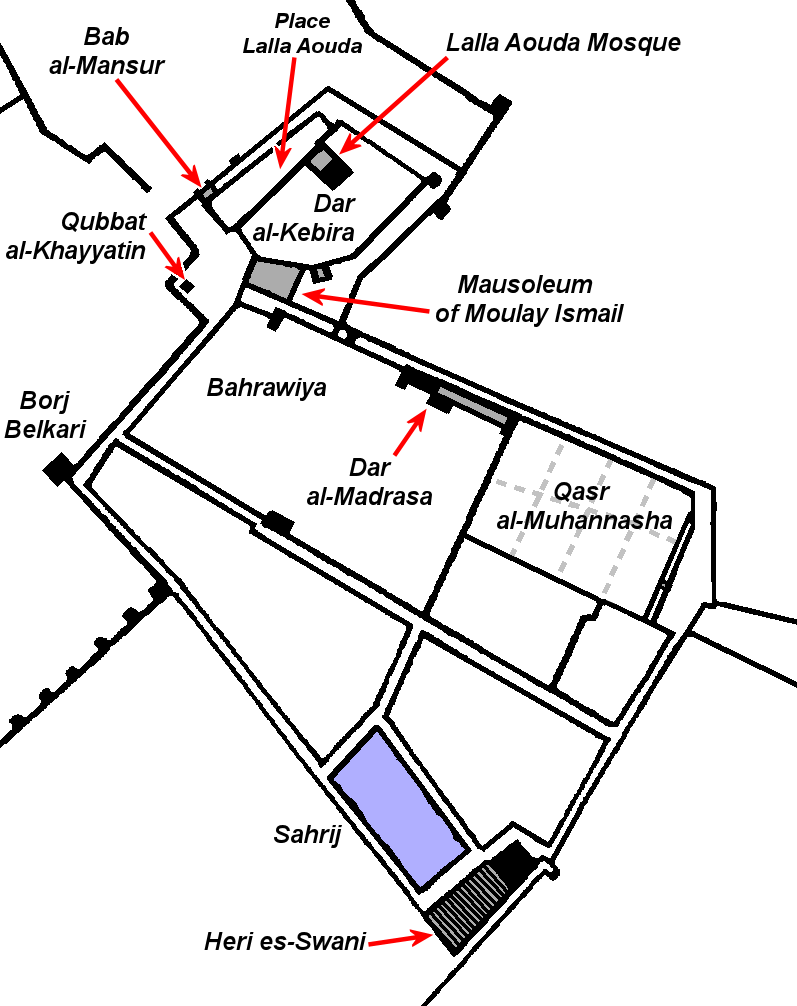
Landmarks and areas around Dar al-Kebira and the main palaces

=== General design and architecture ===
The kasbah of Moulay Isma'il covers a vast, roughly quadrilateral area surrounded by a circuit of walls over 7 kilometers long. Within this area are several walled enclosures which contained their own independent palaces, while a number of other separate palace buildings and functional structures existed beyond these. A large part of the kasbah, especially its southern and eastern regions, was taken up by gardens, fields, and training grounds. Two outlying kasbahs or enclosures, were part of the larger Kasbah and are occupied by residential neighbourhoods today: the Kasbah Beni Muhammad and the Kasbah Hadrash.

The main materials used for construction were rammed earth (or pisé) and brick, of which most walls were made, as well as marble, plaster, and tile used for decoration. Ancient Roman and more recent Saadian spolia (especially marble) were looted from other sites in Morocco wherever available (such as Volubilis and the Badi Palace) and reused for the palaces. The decorative motifs on display are in keeping with the existing artistic traditions of Moroccan architecture, which had by this point been fused with earlier Andalusi (Moorish) architecture.

The general layout of buildings reflects an arrangement seen in the Royal Kasbah of Marrakesh and other Islamic-era palaces in the wider region: a variety of enclosed gardens, pavilions, and apartments were constituted into multiple autonomous palaces, complete with their own amenities and infrastructure, existing separately in conjunction throughout the site. The Qasr al-Muhannasha bears particular resemblances in its spatial arrangement to the Saadian-era Badi Palace of Marrakesh. Isma'il's kasbah, however, was on a larger scale than ever seen before. By some estimates, it covers an area four times larger than the old city of Meknes itself. The architecture of Moulay Isma'il's reign in Meknes is likewise distinguished by its size and scale. The scale and ambition of the project has led historians to nickname it the "Versailles of Morocco". The kasbah also contains a great amount of empty or open space in comparison with the dense urban fabric of the old city. This contrast also kept with the tradition of isolating the sultan and his family from the noise and crowds of the popular city, a tendency apparent in the region since the early Islamic period with examples such as Madinat al-Zahra.

=== Infrastructure ===
The palace complex is also notable for its highly developed infrastructure. Its water supply was particularly sophisticated for the time, making use of an early version of indoor plumbing which distributed water to buildings throughout the Kasbah via canals and underground terracotta pipes. This water was drawn directly from the phreatic table in the so-called House of the Ten Norias (or Dar al-Ma) using a mechanical hydraulic system of chained buckets turned by a wheel. This water supply and underground plumbing system is considered to be a century ahead of the infrastructure found in contemporary European palaces and constructions.

In addition to this civic infrastructure the design of the kasbah appears to have an emphasis on protective fortifications – even by the standards of previous royal citadels. Its outer defensive walls (built in rammed earth) were an astonishing 7 meters thick and its angles or corners were typically fortified with massive bastions (such as Borj Belkari). Especially near the old city, the kasbah and its palaces were protected by two or more lines of defensive walls. Roads and bridges also connected every area, allowing for easier troop movement. The many massive granaries and storage facilities (such as the Heri es-Souani and the so-called Qara "Prison") for food and supplies were also designed to allow the kasbah's inhabitants to survive a long siege, with Moulay Isma'il reportedly claiming his citadel could hold out for ten years under siege. Despite this emphasis on defense, the Kasbah was never submitted to a real siege in Isma'il's time.

== Major structures ==
=== Defensive walls and fortifications ===
The kasbah enclosure is surrounded and protected by imposing thick walls, much of which still survives today. The walls, like those of the palaces and of most Moroccan city walls, were made of pisé or rammed earth. They were around 7 meters thick on average, which was remarkable even for the time. The walls were crowned along their length by typical pointed merlons which sheltered a "chemin de ronde" or wall walk, and reinforced at intervals by square bastion towers. Behind the walls were ring roads and passages that allowed for troops within the kasbah to be deployed along the walls easily.

Some of the major corners in the circuit of walls were further defended by even larger quadrilateral bastion forts which dominate their surroundings. These include the Borj al-Qari (Borj Belkari or Borj Bel Kari) to the southwest of Bab al-Mansour, overlooking the Mellah, the Borj al-Mars at the kasbah's western corner, the Borj Bibi 'Aisha on its far eastern side, and the Borj al-Ma' near the northeastern corner of the Dar al-Makhzen complex. Borj Belkari was much later classified as a national historic monument in 1932 and was converted in the 21st century into a museum of pottery from the Rif region.

The fortifications of the Kasbah were at their most extensive to the north, on the side facing the city, suggesting that Moulay Isma'il saw the city's inhabitants as an equal or even greater threat. For much of their length here the walls were doubled, consisting of two lines of ramparts with a clearing between them, with the outer wall generally being the most fortified. Another line of fortified walls also enclosed the Dar al-Kebira palaces, providing this part of the Kasbah with three layers of defense.

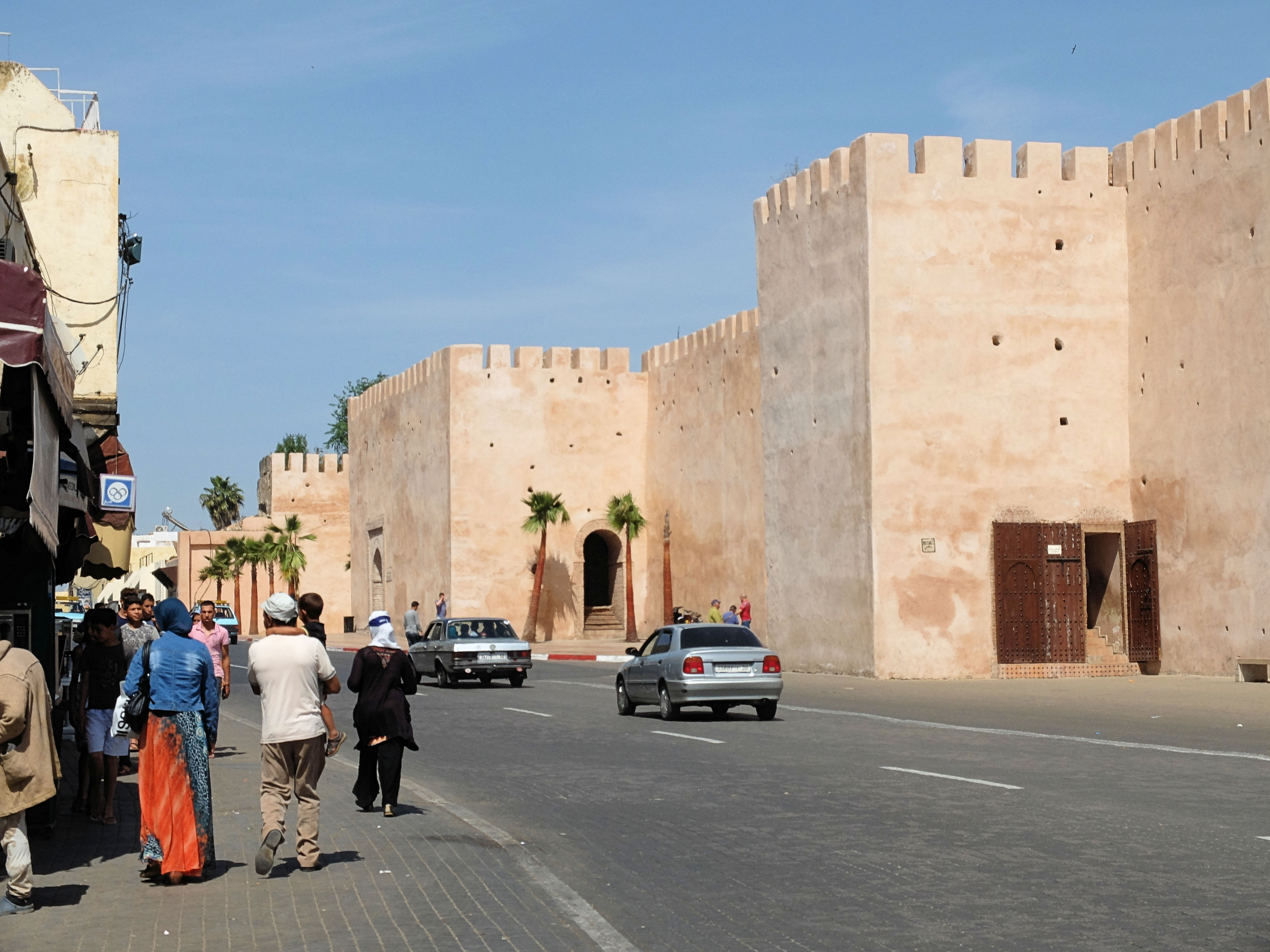
The northwestern walls of the Kasbah, on the edge of the medina

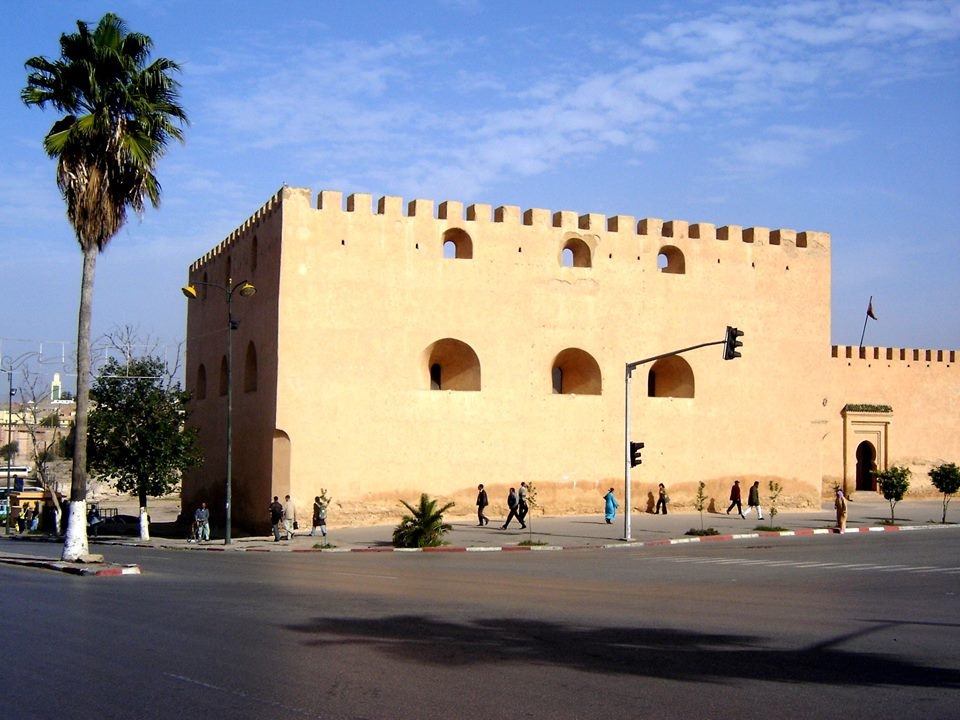
Borj Belkari, a massive corner bastion in the walls of the kasbah (located to the northwest)

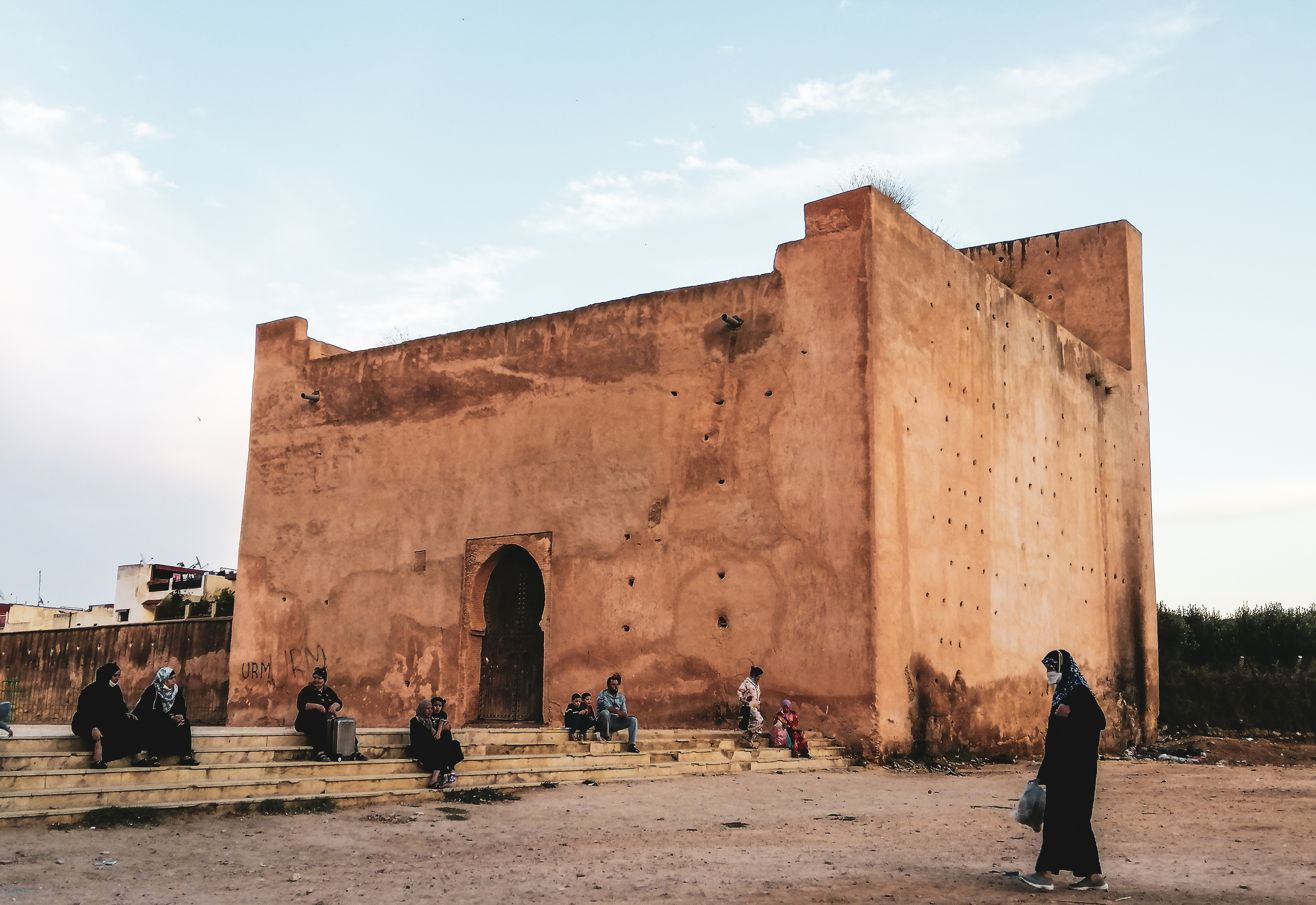
Borj al-Mars (or Borj el-Mers), a bastion at the far western corner of the Kasbah's walls

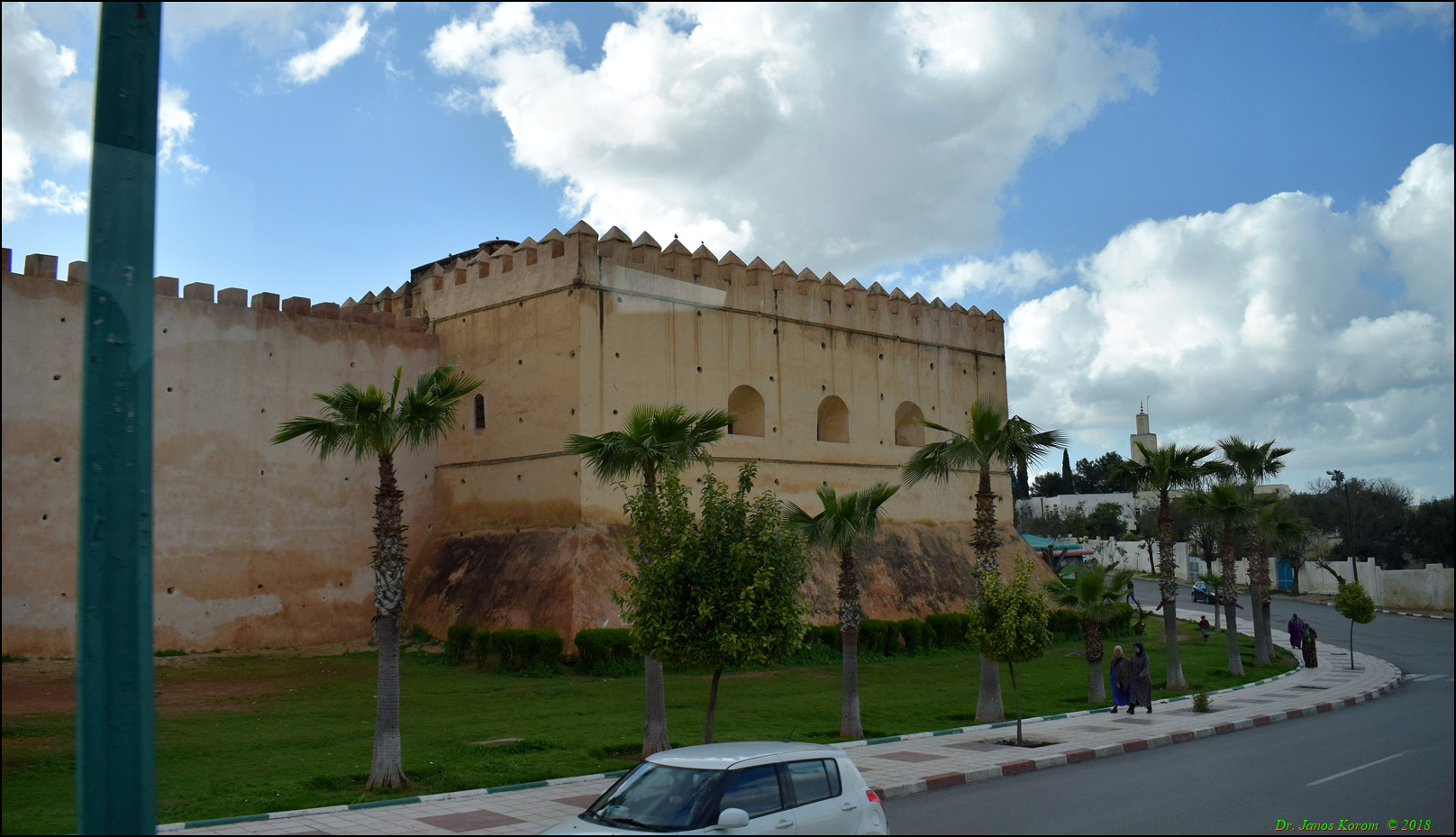
Borj al-Ma, the bastion at the northeastern corner of the outer wall near the Dar al-Makhzen and the assarag avenue

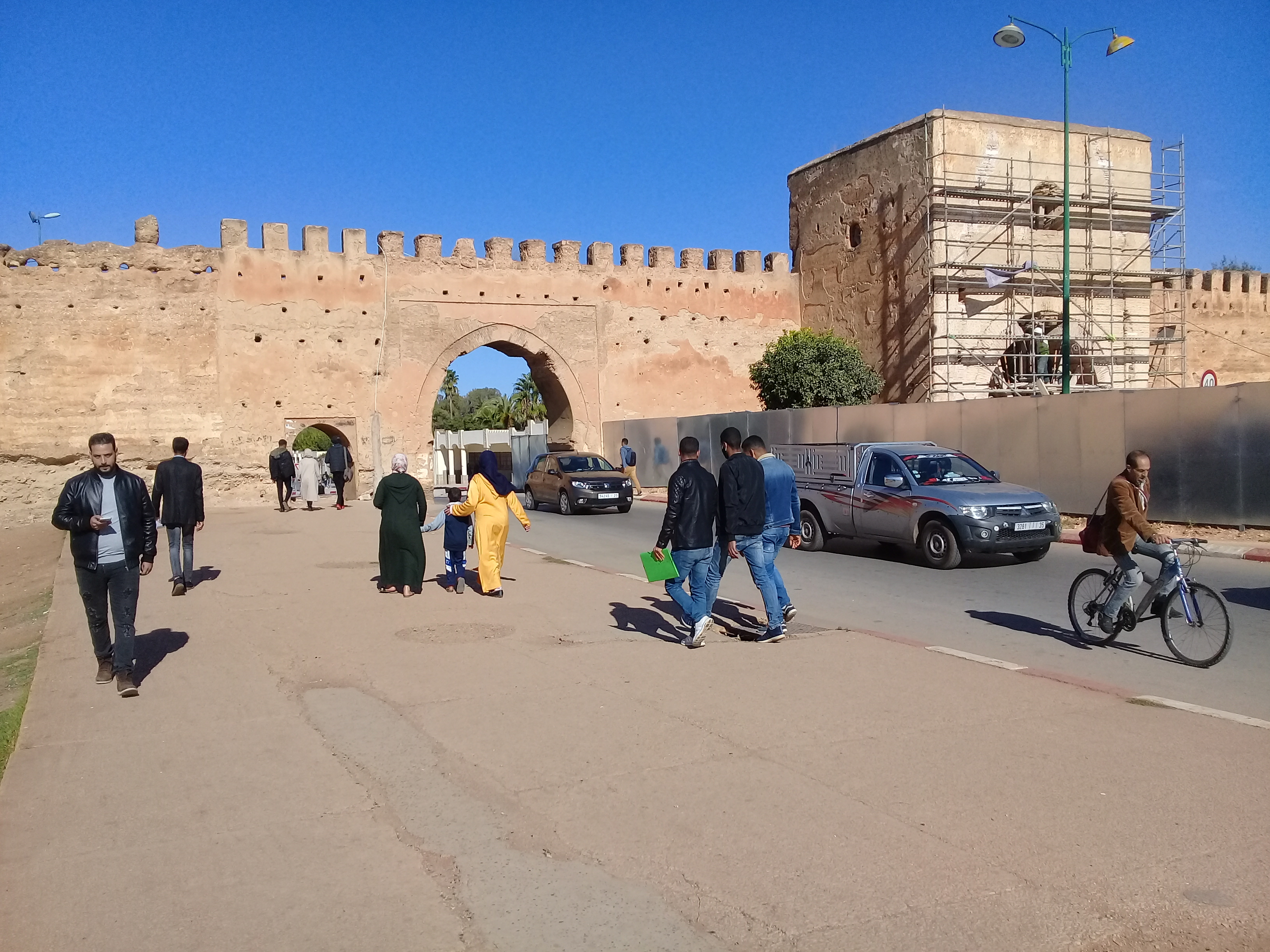
Bab al-Qasdir, a gate in the outer southeastern wall of the Kasbah; the original gate passed through the tower on the right

=== Bab Mansur al-'Alj ===
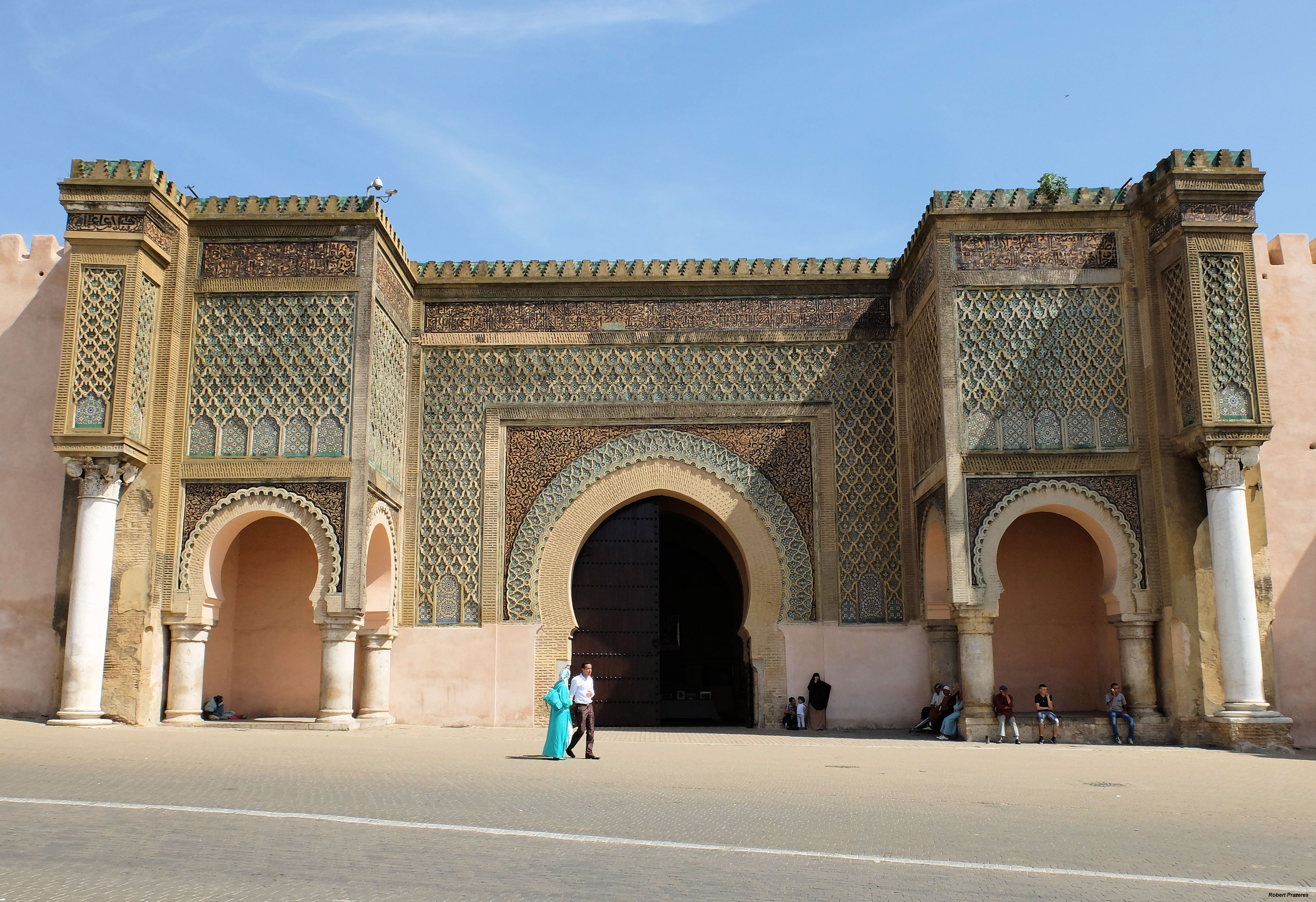
The Bab Mansour gate

The outer ramparts of the kasbah are visible today running along the southeastern side of the medina (old city) and of Place el-Hedim (El-Hedim Square). Place el-Hedim, a vast open square at the center of the historic city today, is named after the rubble which was piled here when Moulay Isma'il demolished the old kasbah of the city and cleared the area for the construction of his new palatial complex. Overlooking this square from the southeast is a monumental and ornamental gate called Bab Mansur al-'Alj or Bab Mansour (also variously spelled as Bab Mansour al-'Ilj, Bab Mansour al-Eulj, Bab el-Mansour, Bab Mansur, etc.).

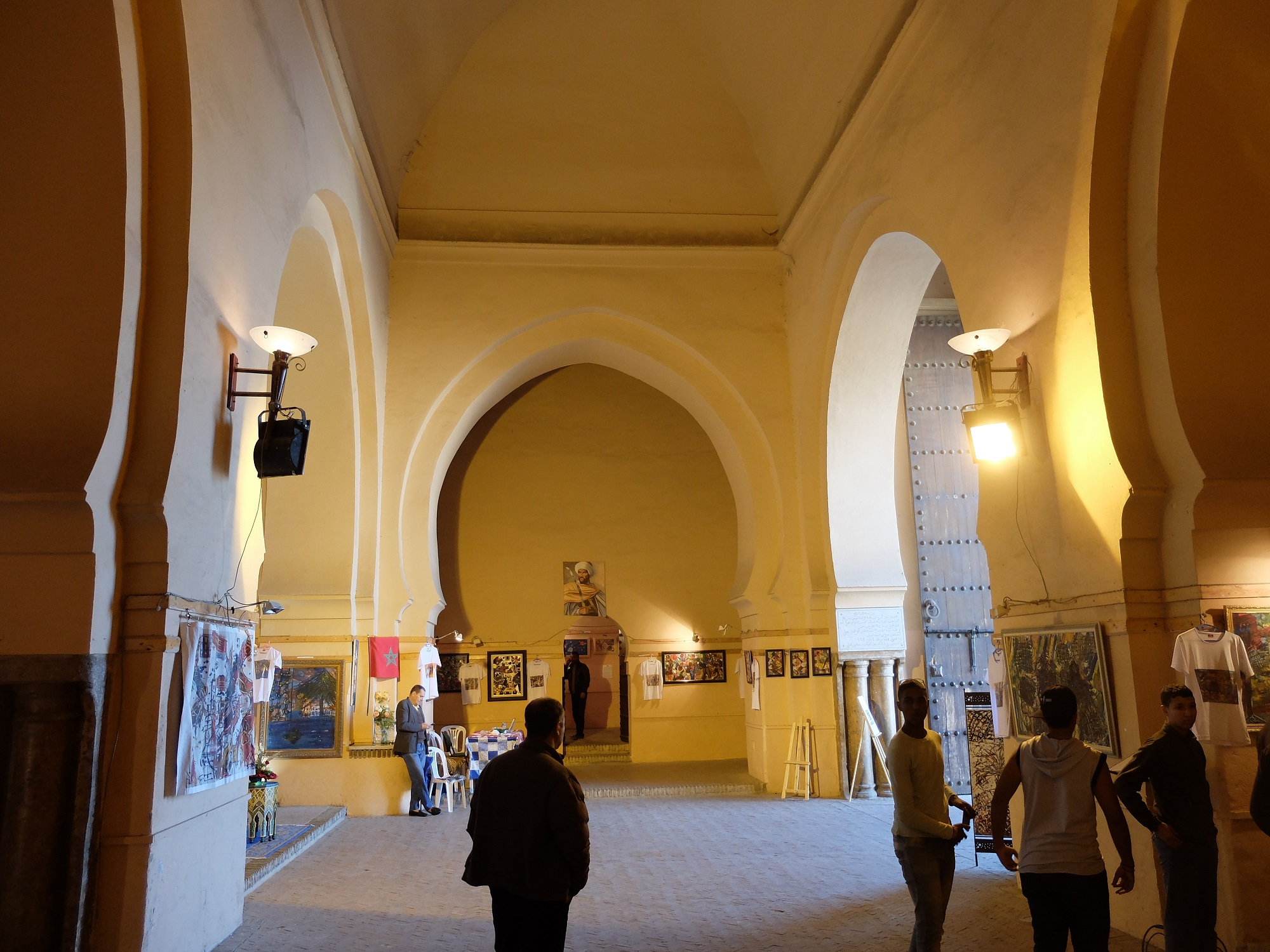
The bent gate passage inside Bab Mansour

Begun in the later years of Moulay Isma'il's reign, the gate was finished in 1732 by his son Moulay Abdallah. The gate's purpose was more ceremonial than defensive, aiming to impress visitors. Its name comes from the architect and designer of the gate, Mansour al-'Alj (the "Victorious Apostate"), a former Christian slave who converted to Islam. The overall design of the gate is based on Almohad prototypes (such as Bab er-Rouah, Bab Agnaou, etc.), with a large horseshoe-arch opening and flanking bastions, but also presents significant new features. In particular, the flanking square bastions or towers are supported on four thick squat columns at the corners with horseshoe arches between them, creating a hollow loggia at the base of the towers. Further out to the sides, flanking the bastions, are massive marble columns supporting large projecting pilasters above. The columns, with ornate composite capitals, are of ancient Roman origin, probably from nearby Volubilis. Inside, the gate's passage is bent, turning 90 degrees twice, and bridges the distance between the double walls of the Kasbah, granting access to Place Lalla Aouda beyond.

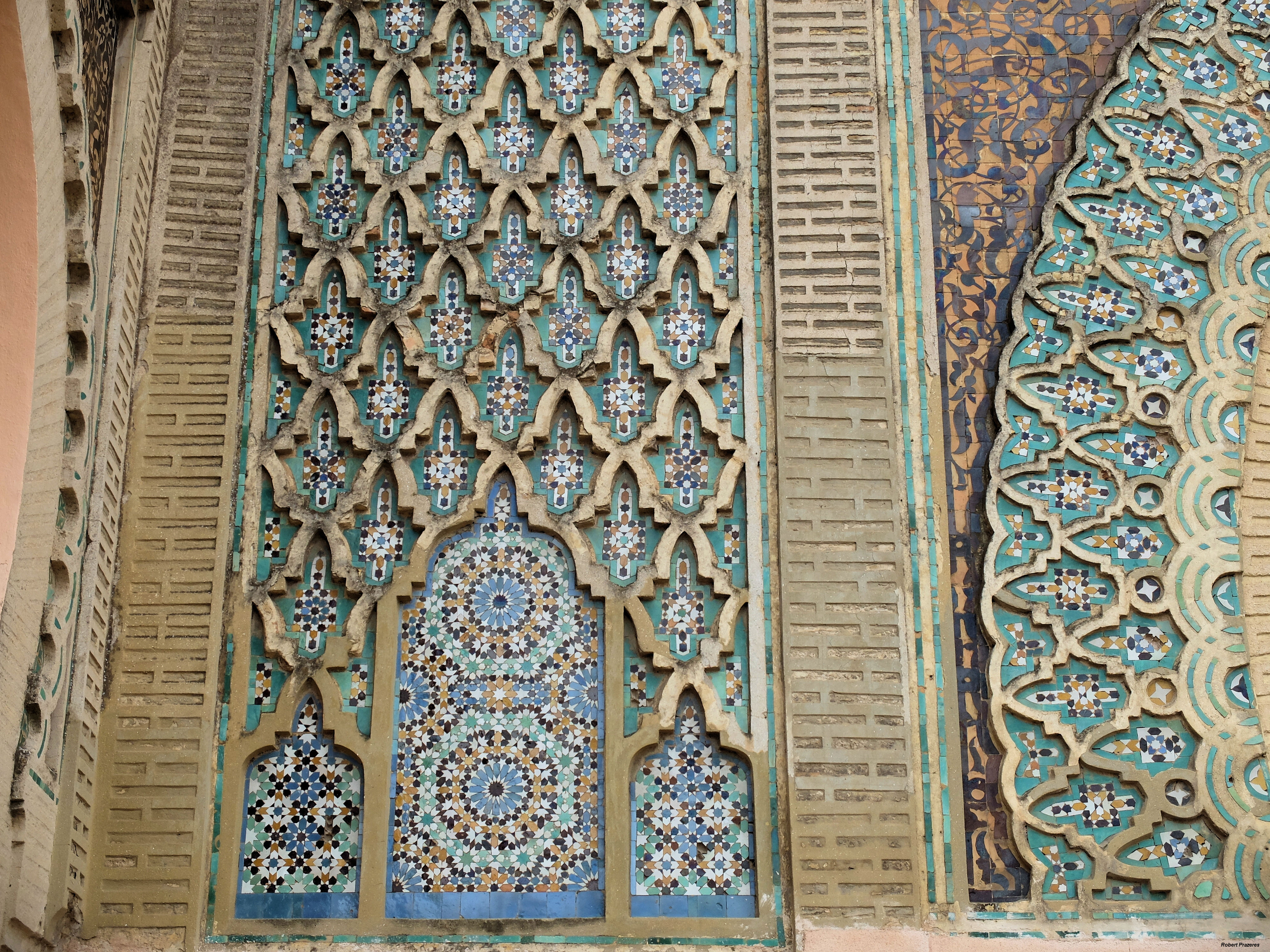
Detail of the darj-wa-ktaf and zellij decoration of Bab Mansour

Almost the entire façade of the gate, including the flanking bastions, is covered in heavy decoration. This consists of a repeating darj-wa-ktaf motif (stylized lozenge-like pattern in Moroccan architecture) which frames the main archway of the gate and fills the spaces above the columns of the flanking bastions. The empty or negative spaces within this motif are entirely filled with colourful zellij (mosaic tilework), another feature which was new to Moroccan monumental gateways. The spandrels of the arches are filled with arabesque-painted tiles. At the very top of the gate, above the other decoration and running along its entire length, is an elaborate Arabic inscription painted on tiles which describes the construction of the gate, which in turn was topped by small "saw-tooth" merlons.

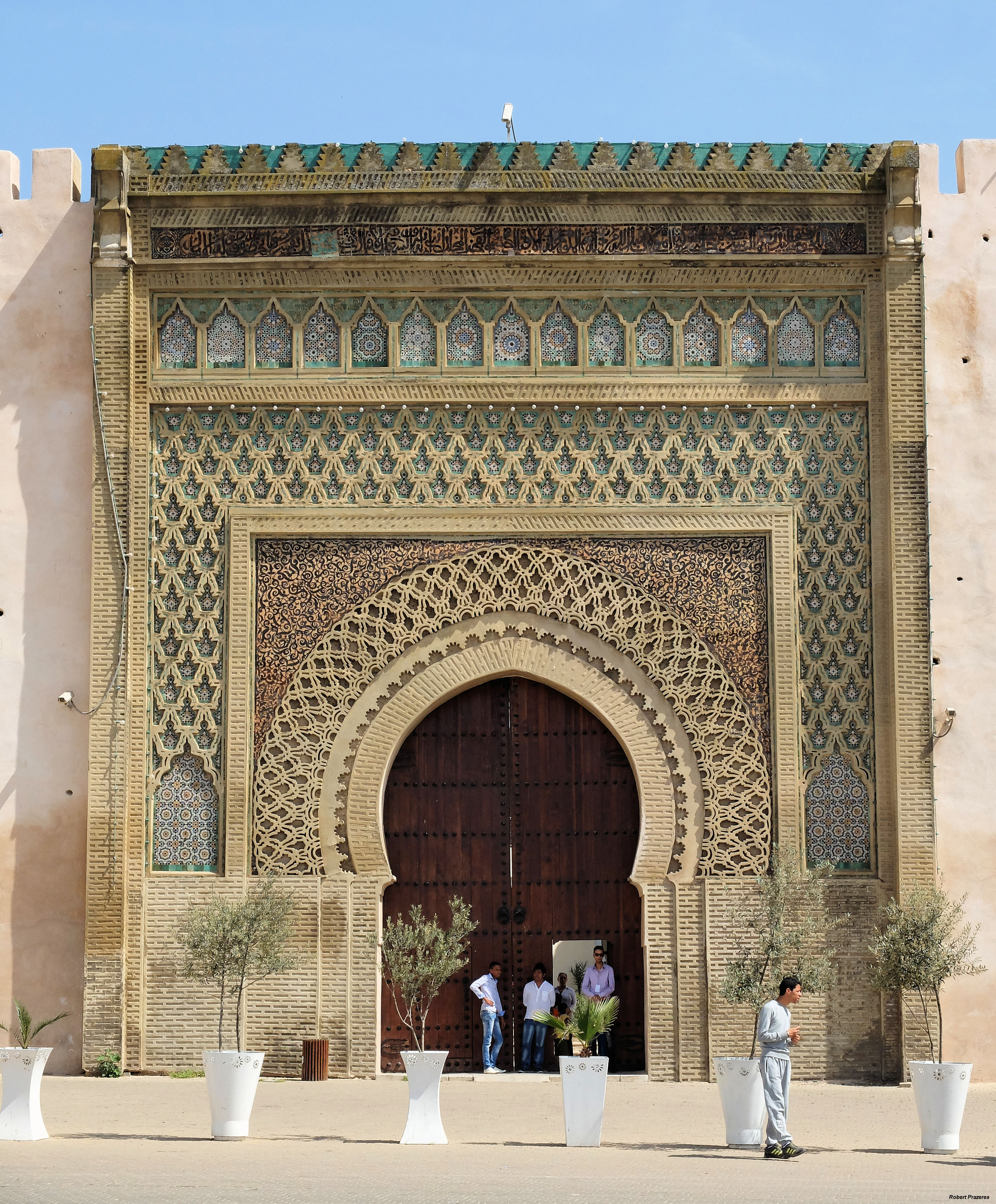
Bab Jama' en-Nouar, near Bab al-Mansur

In the early 19th century, Sultan Moulay Abd ar-Rahman added a loggia-type structure just outside the gate on the right (southwest side), which is no longer present today. The structure served as a meeting place for military and high officials, as the tribunal of the city's governor, and to hold other military or religious ceremonies. Today the gate is usually closed but its interior is sometimes open to host exhibits.

Another ornate gate, Bab Jama' en-Nouar, also stands a short distance to the southwest along the same wall. It has similar decoration to the larger Bab el-Mansour and is believed to also date from the time of Moulay Isma'il.

=== Place Lalla Aouda (Mechouar) ===
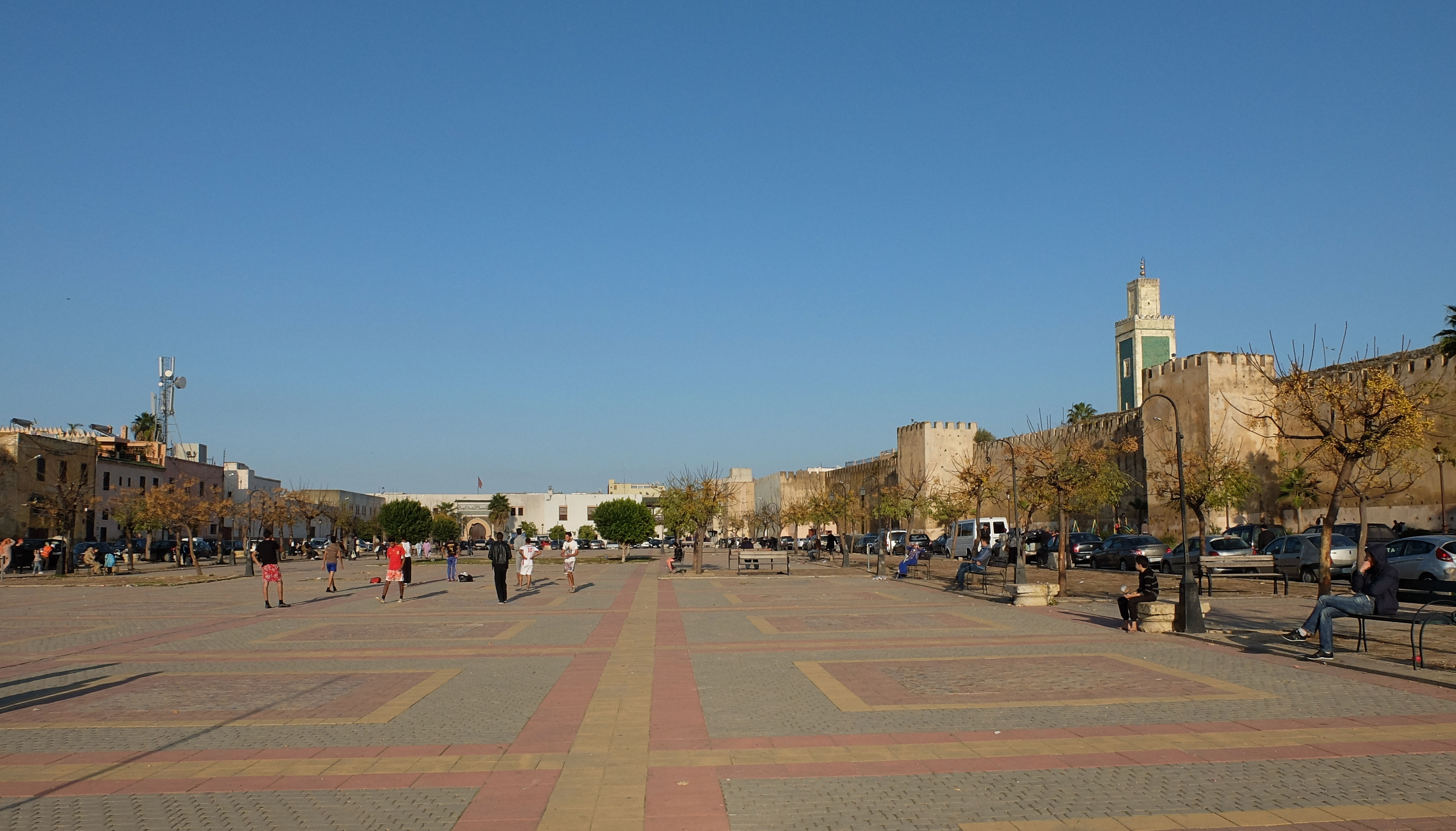
Place Lalla Aouda today; the minaret of the Lalla Aouda Mosque is visible on the right

Place Lalla Aouda, still present today, is a vast public square accessed through Bab al-Mansur. It served as the mechouar (or mishwar) of the palace, a parade ground where official ceremonies, receptions, and military parades could take place. At the eastern end of the square, accessed through one of two gates in the ramparts, is the Lalla Aouda Mosque.

==== Lalla Aouda Mosque ====
This was the main royal mosque of the kasbah, renovated or rebuilt by Moulay Isma'il, possibly around 1677, on the site of the former Marinid-era mosque of the kasbah. It was accessed through two monumental doorways from Place Lalla Aouda or by another gate located near the qibla (southeastern) wall and accessed directly from the palaces. From the gates on Place Lalla Aouda, the mosque was approached through a small courtyard or walled square (an unusual feature for a mosque), on the southeastern side of which was a madrasa and an ablutions house. The mosque itself has its inner courtyard or sahn, surrounded an arcaded gallery and by the main interior prayer hall to the southeast. Another unusual feature was the two large chambers facing each other on the southwestern and northeastern sides of the courtyard, one of which served as a prayer hall for women and the other as a library. The mosque's large green-tiled minaret, prominently visible from Place Lalla Aouda, is similar in form and decoration to that of the Grand Mosque of Meknes in the city.

=== Dar al-Kebira ===
The Dar al-Kebira (also spelled Dar Kebira or Dar Kbira) is the oldest and smallest of the palaces built within the kasbah, finished in 1679 and covering 13.5 hectares. Its name means "the Great House" and it was the private palace of Moulay Isma'il and his family. It consisted of a number of more or less self-contained sub-palaces clustered together, each of which consisted of a rectangular courtyard around which were arranged living quarters, reception rooms, kitchens, bathhouses (hammams), and/or gardens. Like the other palace enclosures built later, the Dar al-Kebira was enclosed by its own defensive wall. Its main gate, featuring more heavy decoration in the same style seen in other gateways of Moulay Isma'il's time, is the Bab ad-Dar al-Kabira or Bab Dar el-Kebira to the south, finished in 1679–80, making it the earliest completed gate in the Kasbah. The Mosque of Lalla Aouda, which served as the main mosque of the palace, could also be entered directly from the palaces via a passage on its qibla (southeastern) side. On the southwest side of the palace complex is the Mausoleum of Moulay Isma'il, accessed from the road between the Dar al-Kebira and the other palaces to the south. To the east of the Dar el-Kebira, outside the city walls, is a cemetery and the neighbourhood of Sidi Amar.

All that remains today of the Dar al-Kebira palace are some of its ruined walls. The site of the palace has been converted into a residential neighbourhood where residents have constructed their houses inside and between the walls of the former palace, with some of the palace walls and passages still visible.

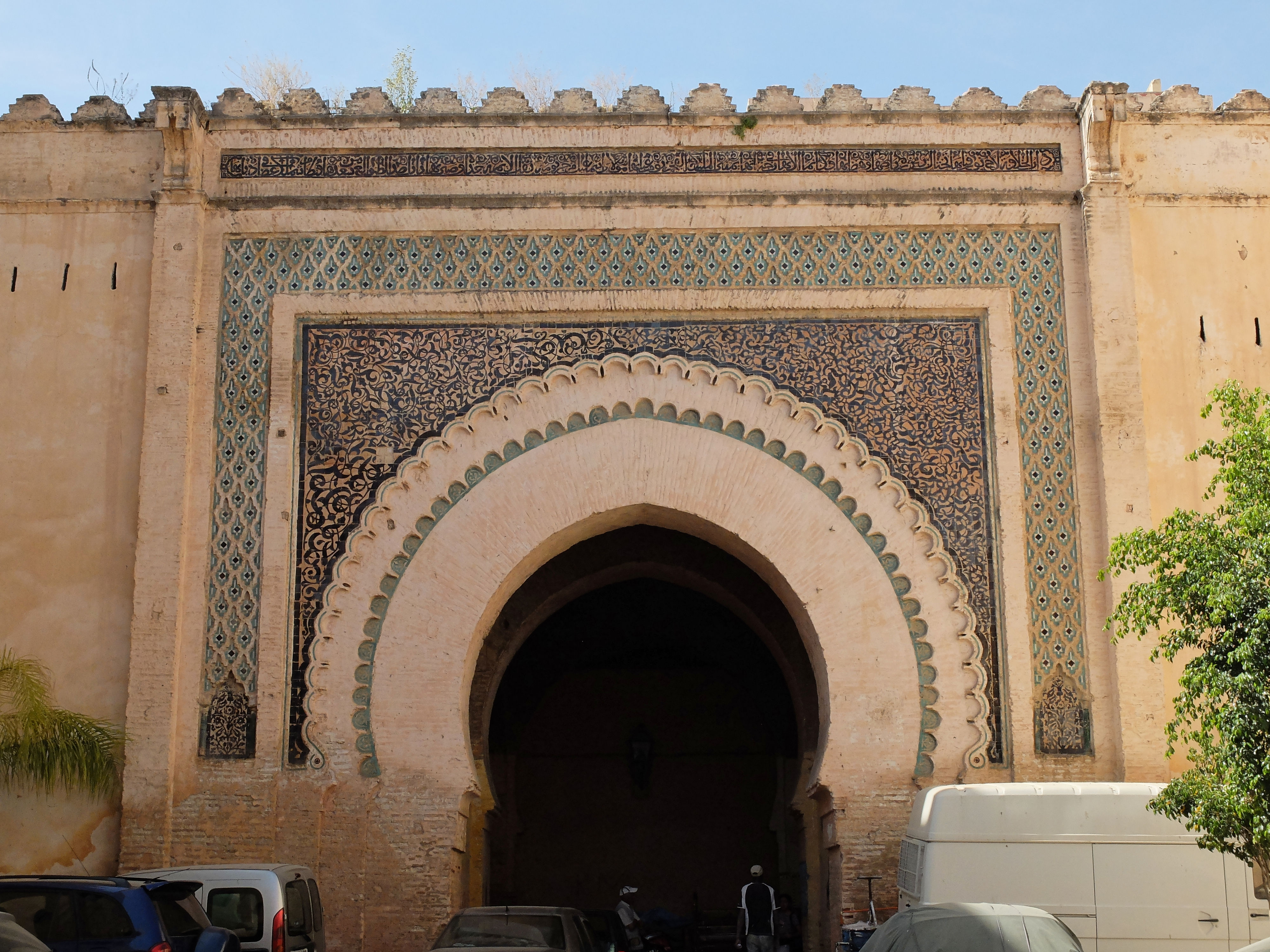
The gate of the Dar al-Kebira (on the south side of the neighbourhood)

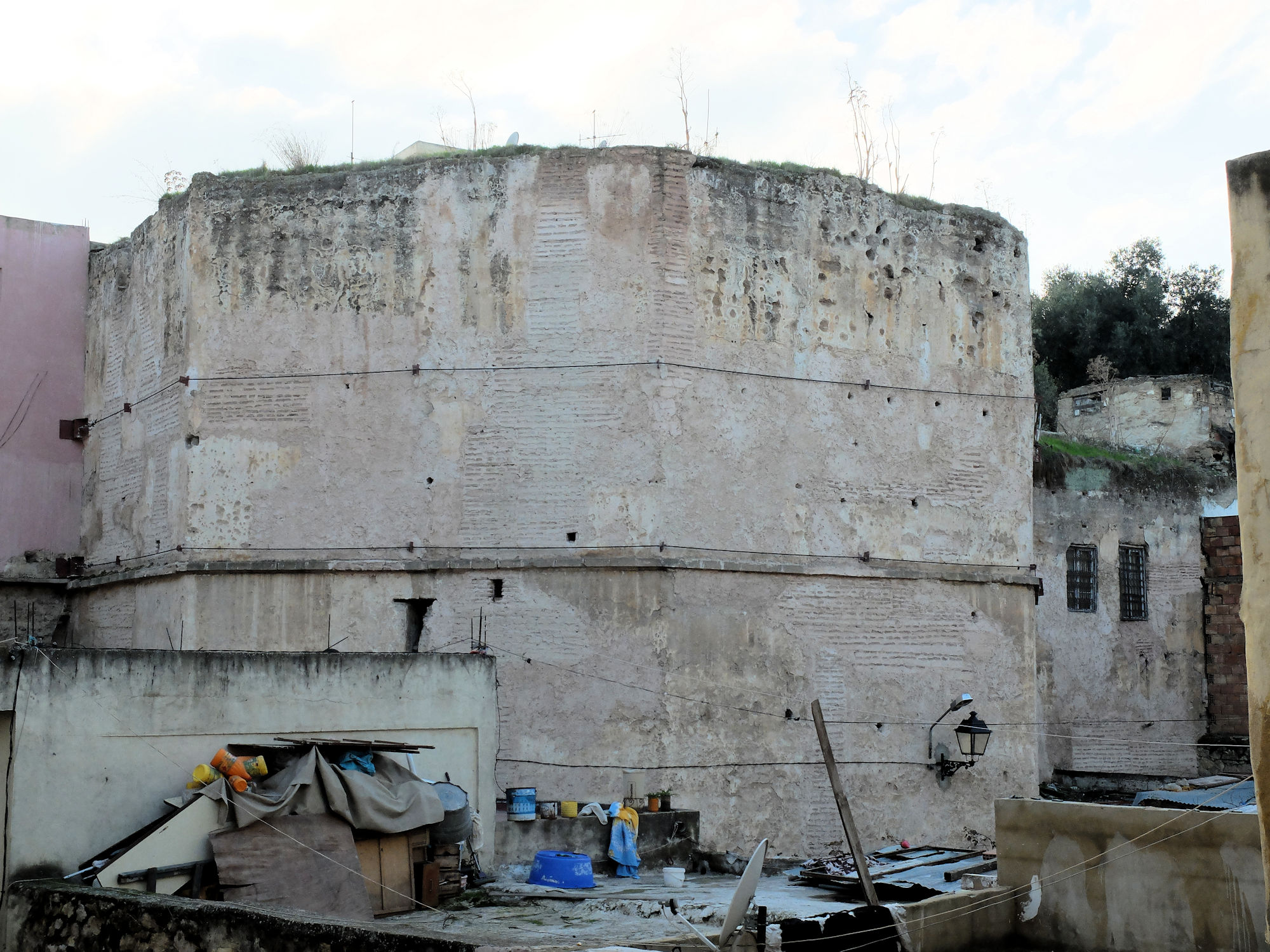
The northeastern bastion tower of the former enclosing wall around Dar al-Kebira

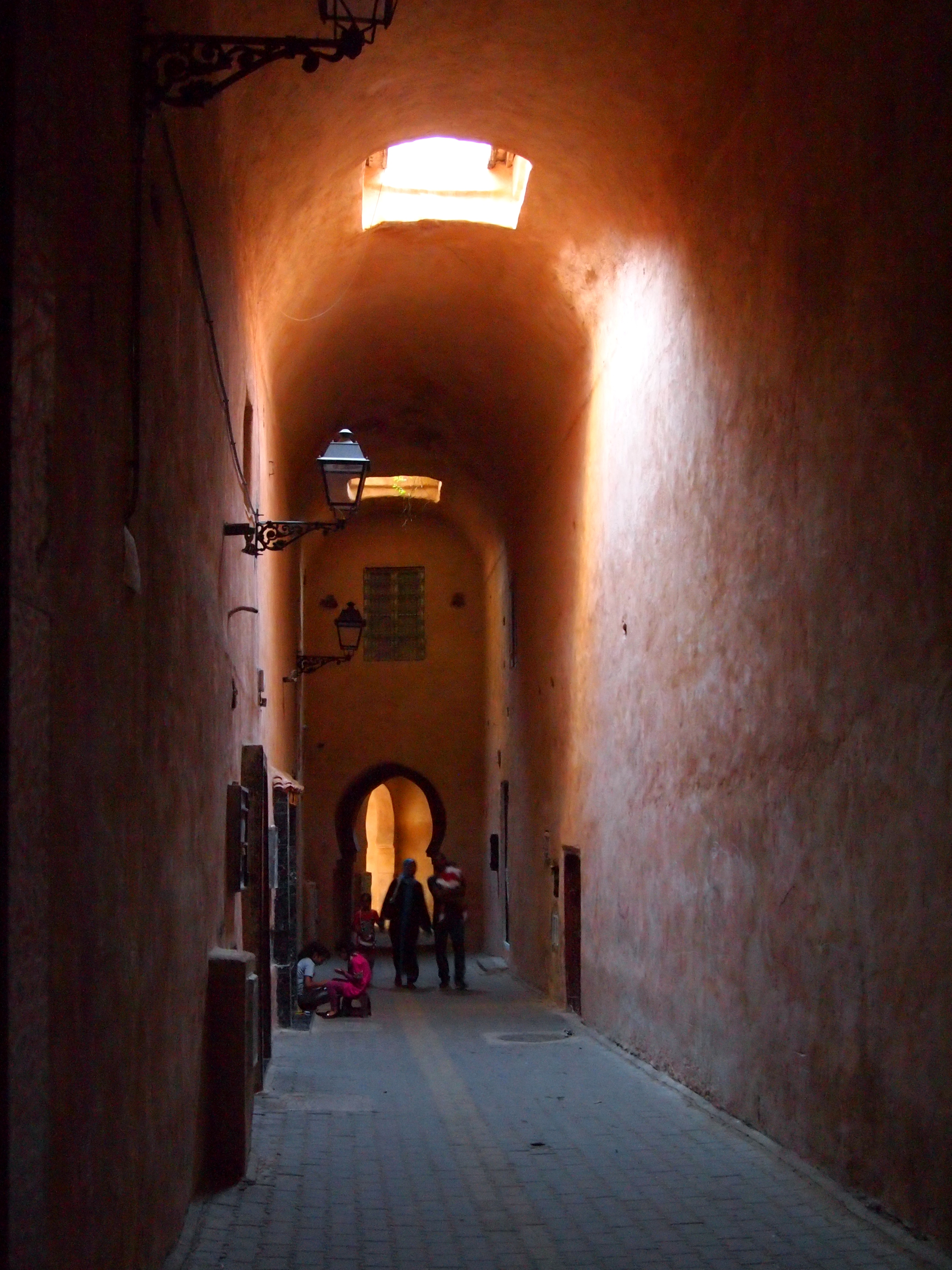
Vaulted passage in the Dar al-Kebira neighbourhood, leftover from the former palace

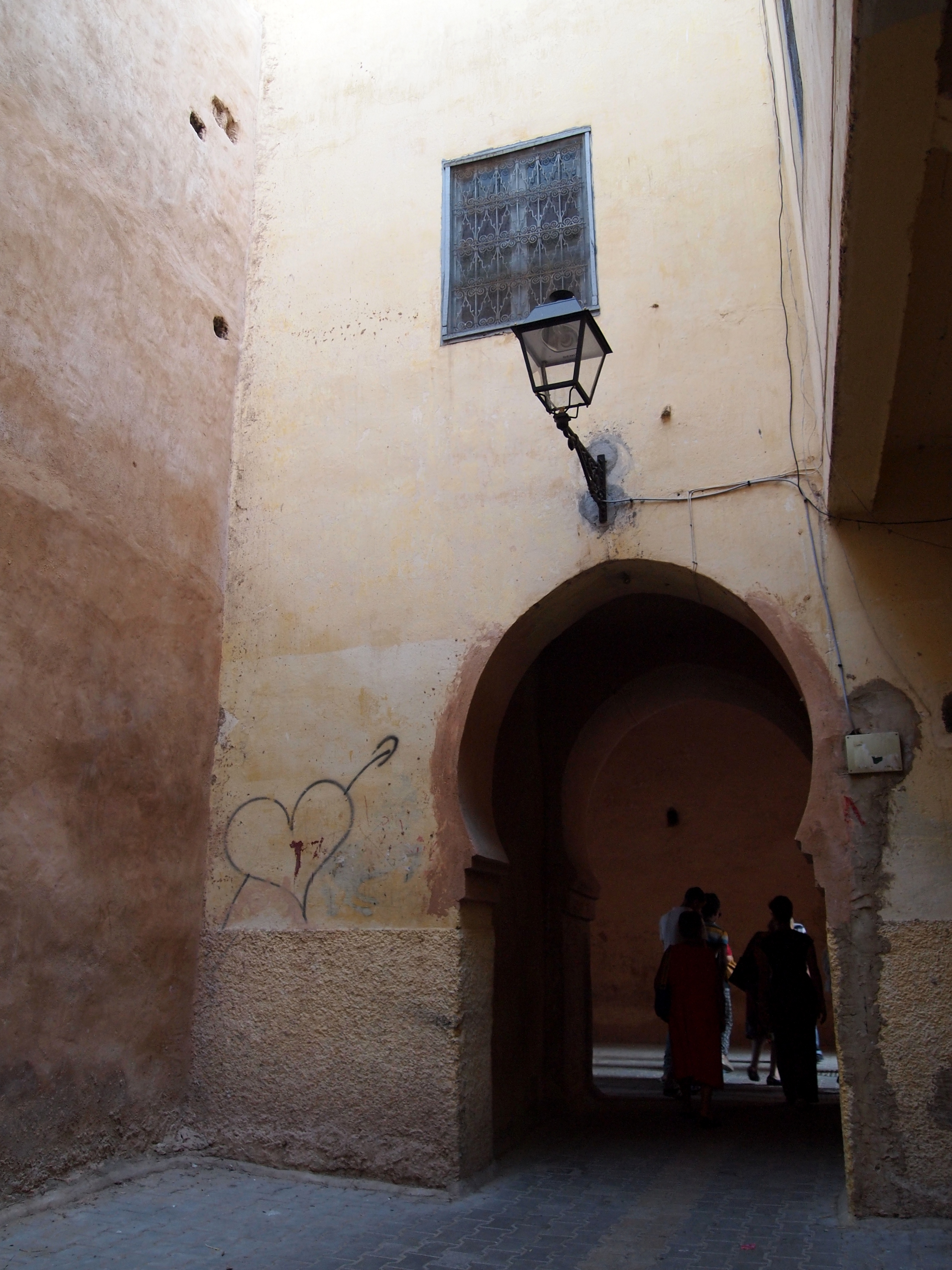
Streets and passages in the Dar al-Kebira neighbourhood today

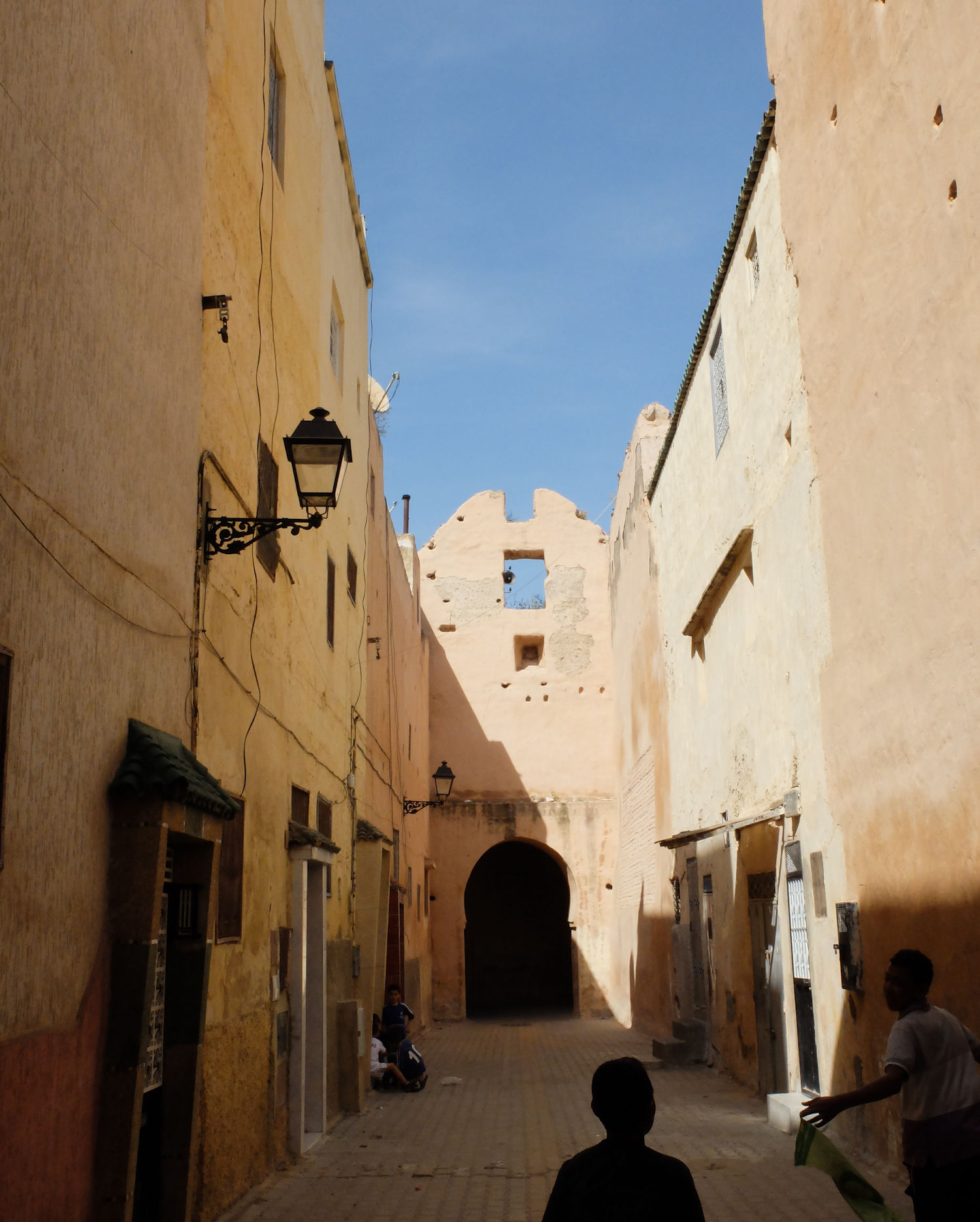
Streets and passages in the Dar al-Kebira neighbourhood today

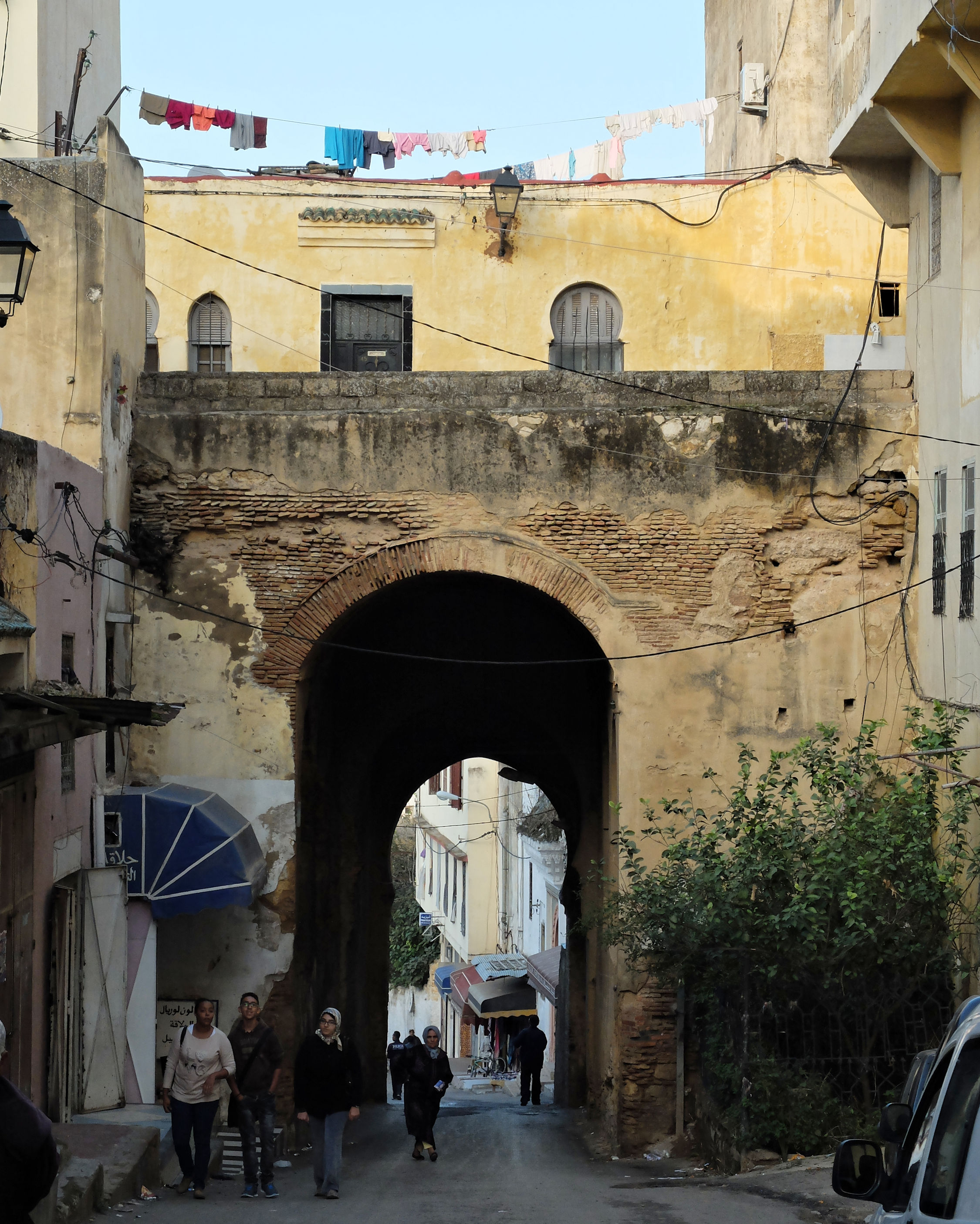
Bab al-Hajjar, the northeastern gate of Dar Kbira

=== Qubbat al-Khayyatin ===
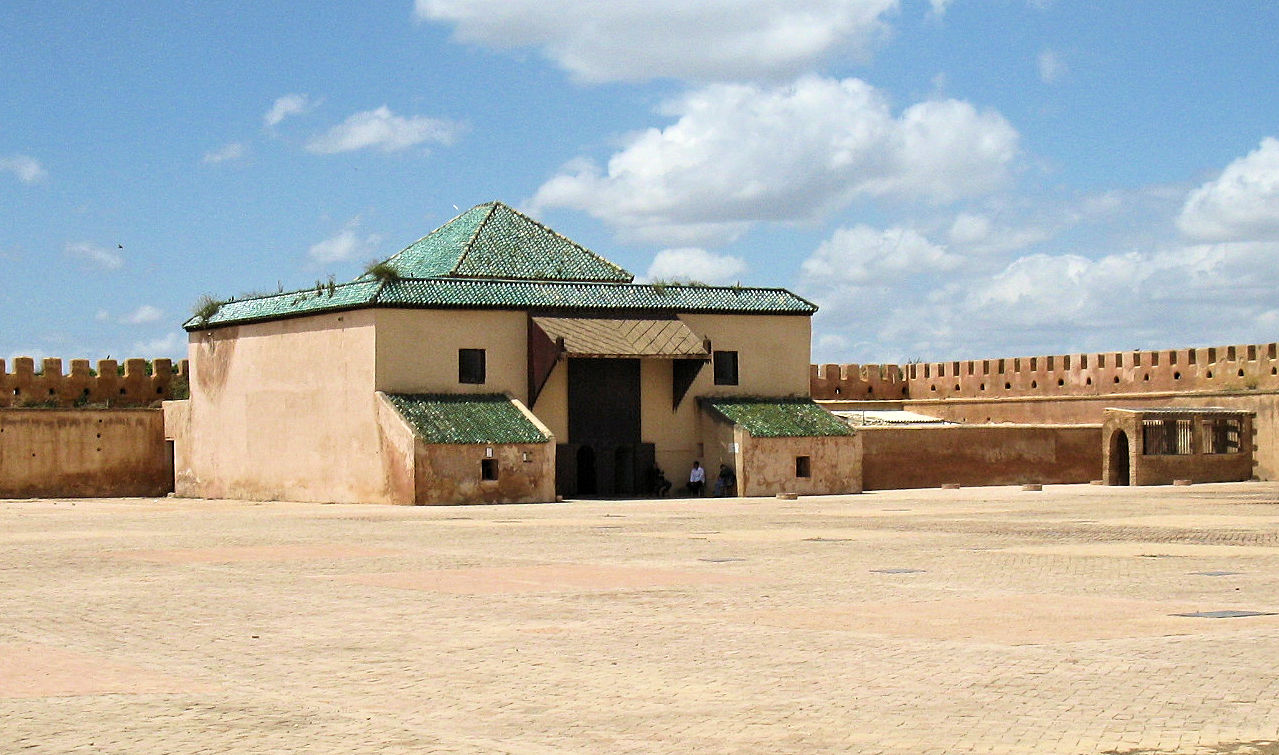
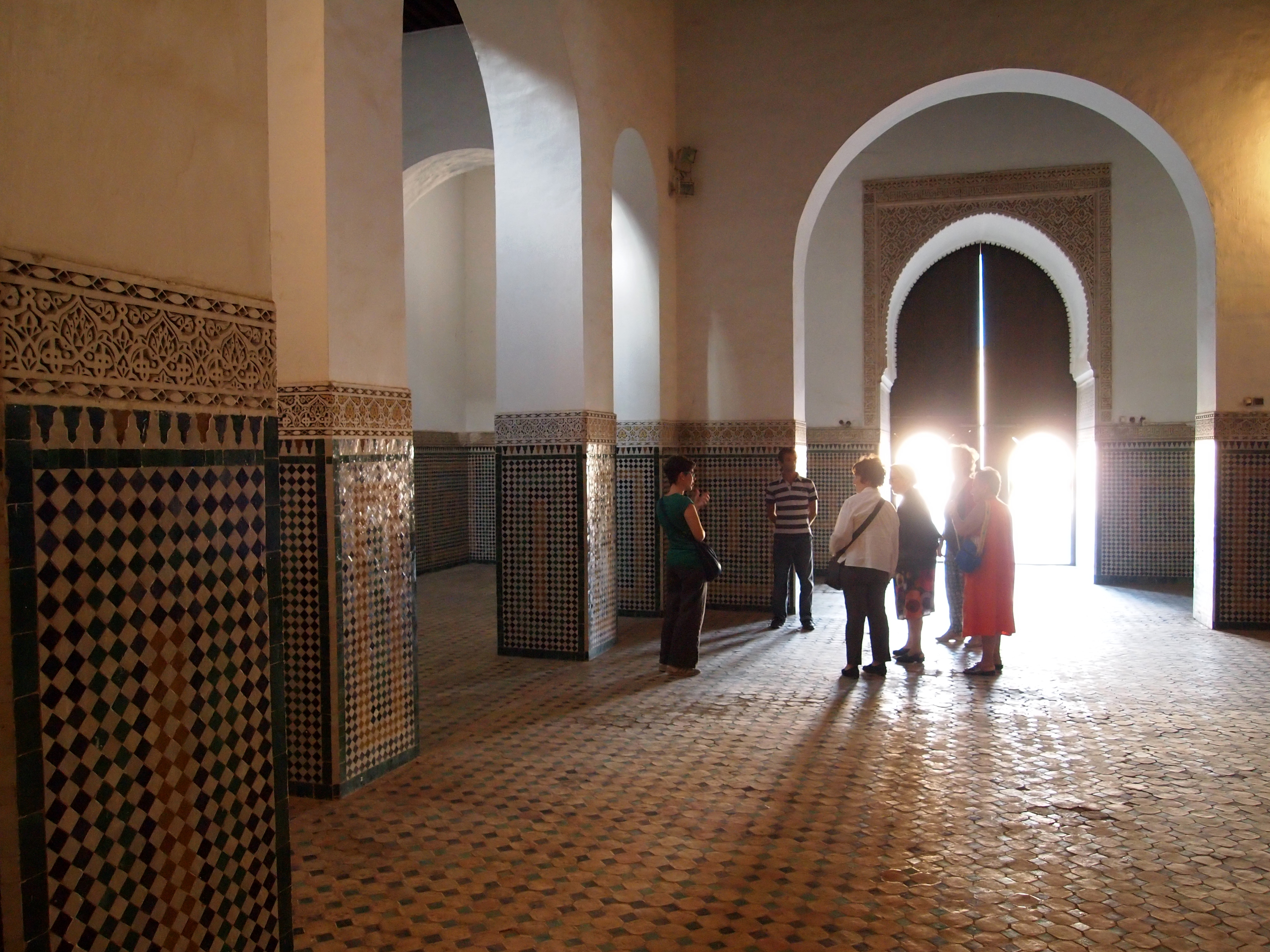
The exterior and interior of the Qubbat al-Khayyatin

The Qubbat al-Khayyatin ("Cupola of the Tailors") was originally Moulay Isma'il's a reception hall for foreign ambassadors, which is why it is also known as the Pavilion of the Ambassadors. Its current name derives from its later use as a workshop for creating military uniforms. In the late 20th century it was used as a carpenters' shop before becoming a tourist attraction. The structure has the form of a large pavilion fronted by a large open square, located on a vast terrace directly southwest of the Dar al-Kebira palace. The facade of the building is marked by a monumental doorway leading the main hall inside. The interior has a roughly basilical layout, being divided by two rows of arches that form a central aisle. Some examples of stucco-carved decoration remain in some areas and the floor and lower walls are covered in zellij tiles, but this is also the result of significant restoration.

=== Qara Prison ===
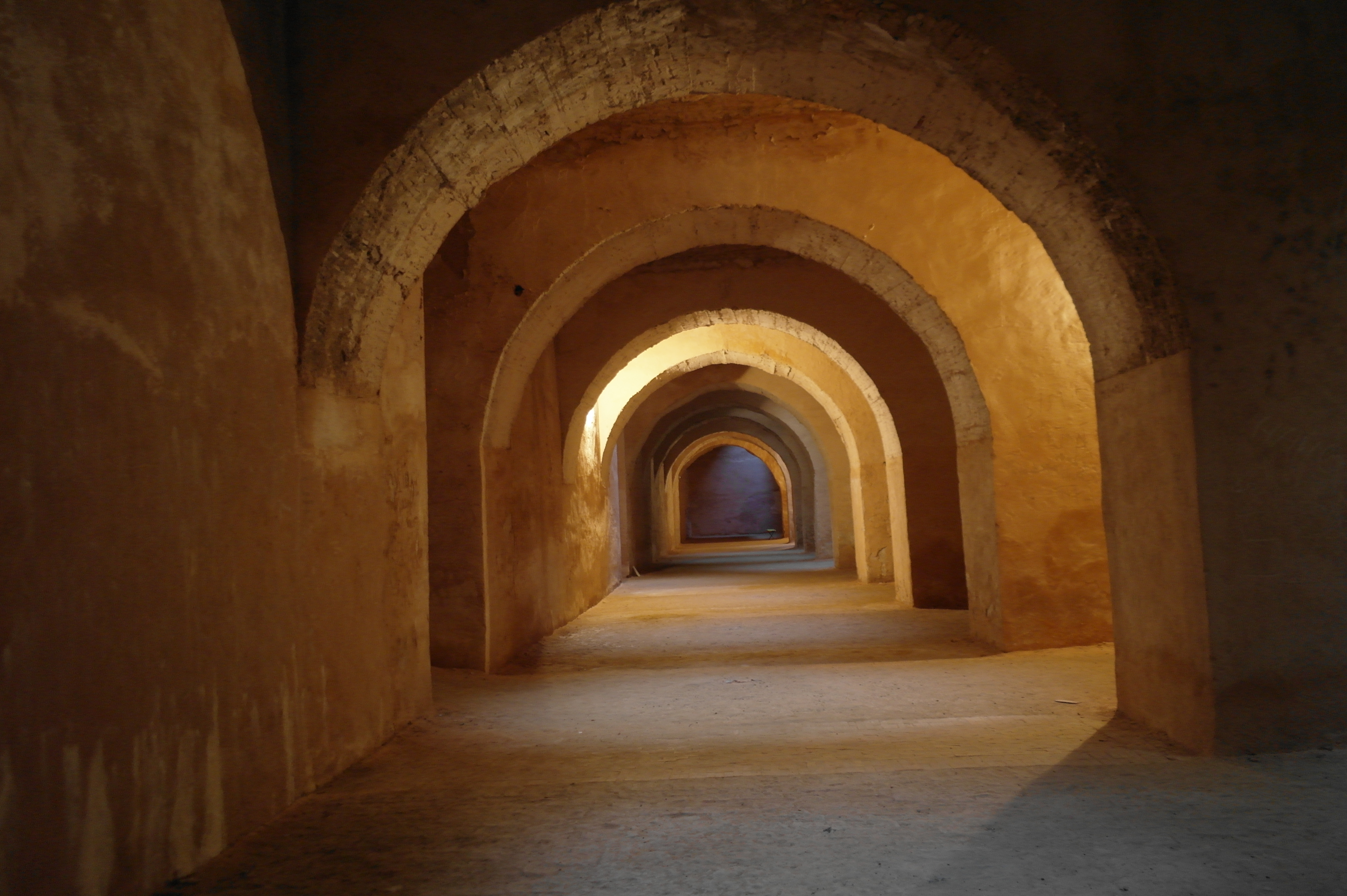
The "Qara Prison", an underground storehouse or silo near the Qubbat al-Khayyatin

Under the square in front of the Qubbat al-Khayyatin are a series of large underground vaulted chambers, some of which are still walled-off and not fully explored. The structure is popularly described as a "prison" where Christian captives were kept, with one story claiming it was built and named after a Portuguese prisoner who Moulay Isma'il promised to release if he built a prison that could house more than 40,000 captives. However, most scholars believe the structure was in fact a storehouse or silo from Moulay Isma'il's time. The number of Christian prisoners was far smaller (by some estimates, less than a thousand) and they were likely housed in several different areas at different times; the last of which was near a Franciscan convent in the old medina, near the present-day Zaytuna Mosque. The subterranean structure today is nonetheless still known as the Qara Prison or Habs Qara (Moroccan Arabic: حبس قارا, lit. 'Prison of the Bald'). Other parts of Moulay Isma'il's palace complex were apparently also built on similar vaulted substructures which served as storage for supplies and military equipment.

=== Mausoleum of Moulay Ismail ===
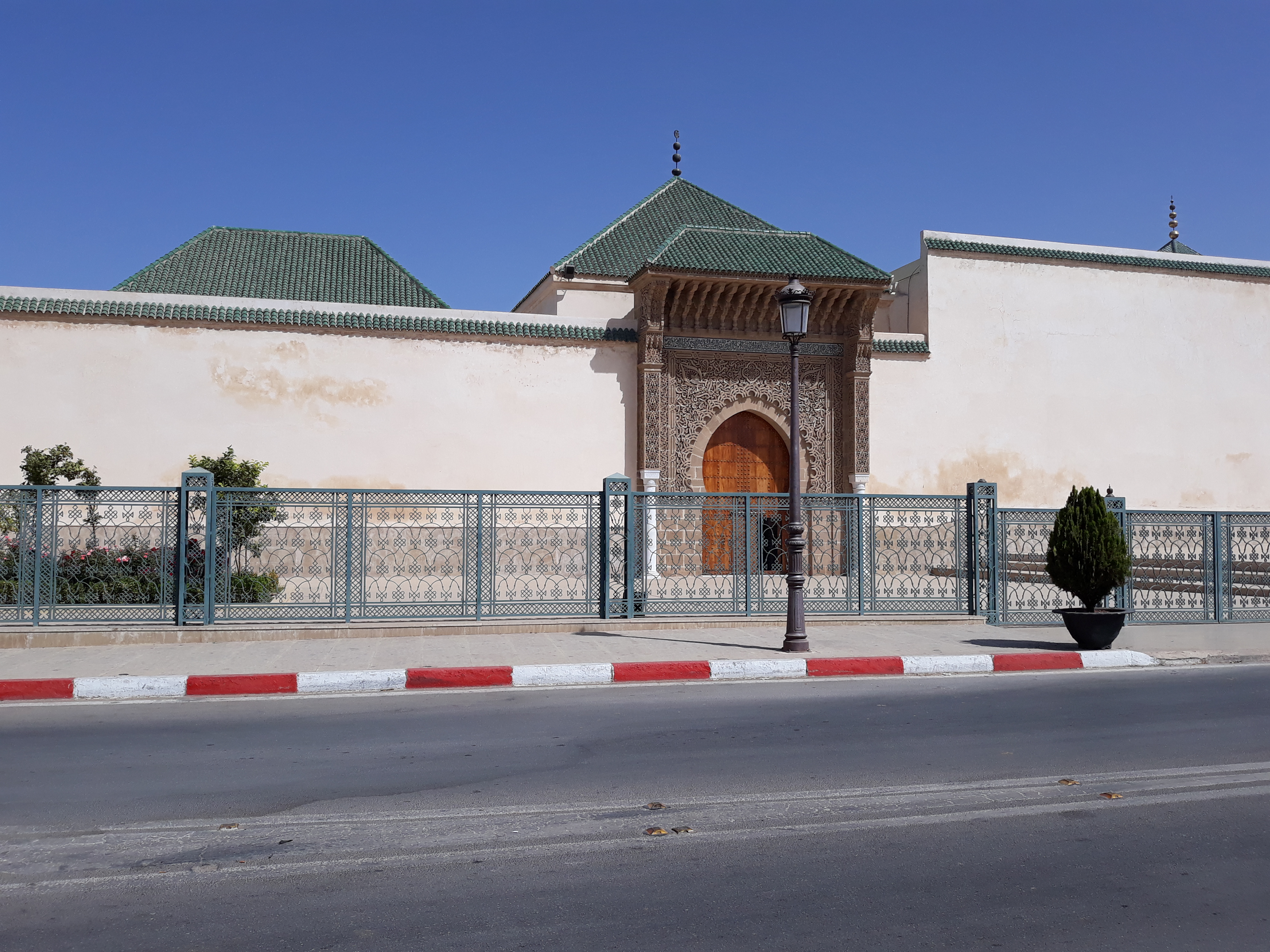
Exterior of the Mausoleum of Moulay Isma'il

The Mausoleum of Moulay Isma'il is a funerary complex located on the southwest side of the former Dar al-Kebira Palace, in a space that was formerly between the inner and outer perimeter walls of the palace. Moulay Isma'il chose this location in part because it was already considered sanctified by the presence of the tomb of Sidi 'Abd ar-Rahman al-Majdub, a 16th-century poet and Sufi mystic. The complex was built under Moulay Isma'il, but was modified and expanded multiple times, in particular under his son and brief successor, Ahmad ad-Dhahabi (who ruled, with interruptions, between 1727 and 1729), who was in turn buried here afterwards. The funerary complex was originally entered from the north, directly from the Dar al-Kebira palace. The current entrance to the south dates from the French protectorate period in the 20th century. The original complex was less extensive than it is today and its plan likely included only the tomb chamber, the adjoining rooms on either side of it, and the main courtyard leading up to it. The other courtyards and passages were thus likely added later. Other enclosures and courtyards adjacent to the complex are occupied by cemeteries known as the Jama' Rkham.

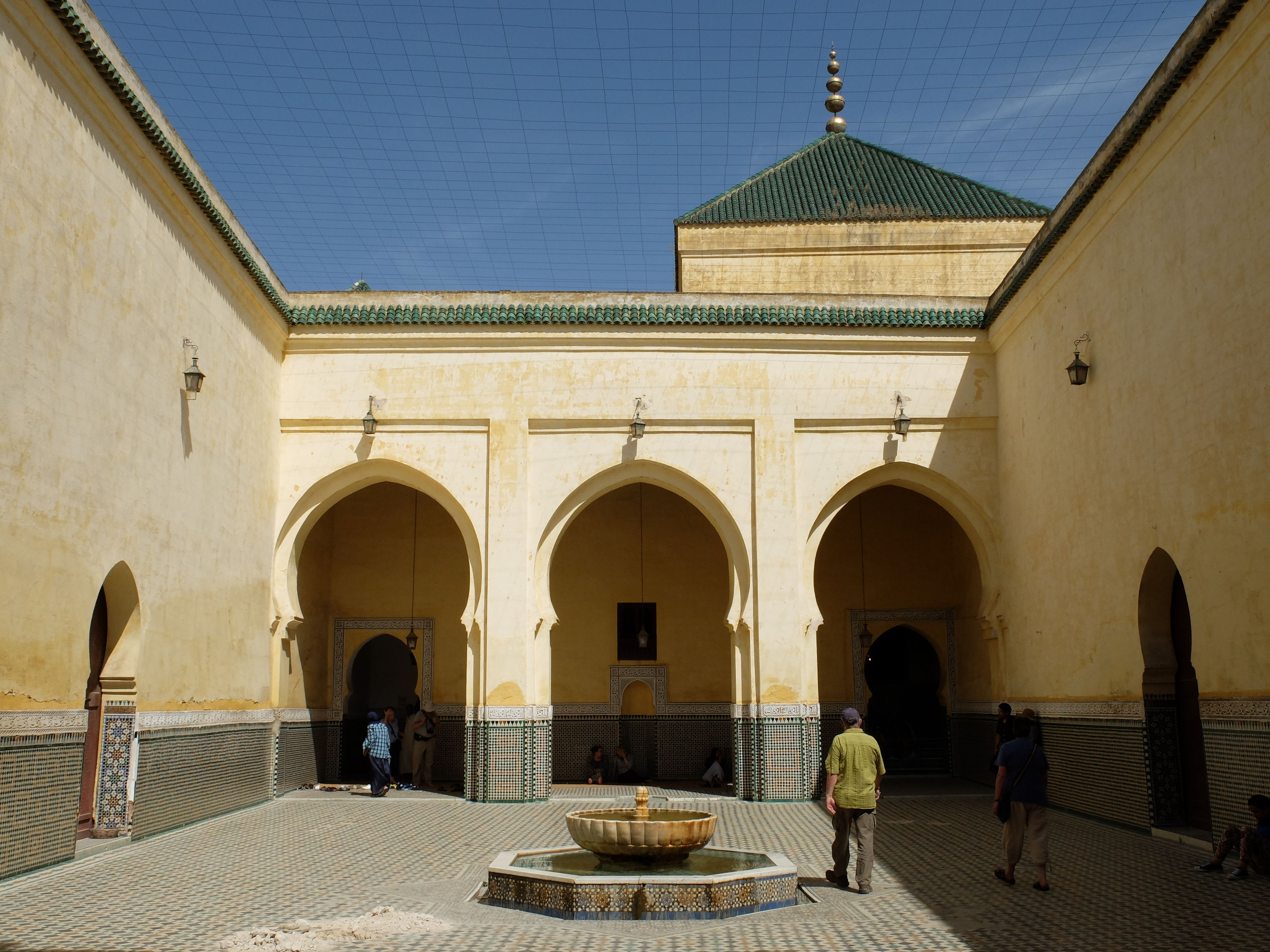
Main courtyard preceding the tomb chamber (green pyramidal cupola of the tomb chamber visible on the right)

The main central courtyard of the funerary complex is sparsely decorated except for a central fountain and zellij pavement. The western and eastern sides of the courtyard are occupied by porticoes of three horseshoe arches. The eastern wall of the courtyard, in front of the mausoleum, also features a small mihrab (niche indicating the direction of prayer). Behind this are the mausoleum chamber and adjoining rooms. The northernmost of these rooms, which can be accessed directly from the northeastern corner of the courtyard, consists of an indoor patio or courtyard covered by a high cupola ceiling. The layout of this patio is similar to the Chamber of the Twelve Columns in the Saadian Tombs, consisting of a square delineated by twelve marble columns arranged in groups of three at each corner, around which runs a gallery space. Another mihrab is set into the eastern wall, while a small side-chamber is set into the western wall. The upper walls and the areas around the mihrab and doorways are decorated with carved and painted stucco featuring arabesque and epigraphic motifs typical of Moroccan architecture. At the center of the patio is an ornate fountain, and while the cupola ceiling above primarily features painted and carved wood. The marble columns feature Moroccan-Andalusian capitals carved with leaf, palm, and palmette motifs. These marble columns, as well as the ornately carved marble panels in the archway leading to the mausoleum antechamber, are believed to be spolia taken by Moulay Isma'il from the former Saadian palaces of in the Kasbah of Marrakesh (such as the Badi Palace).

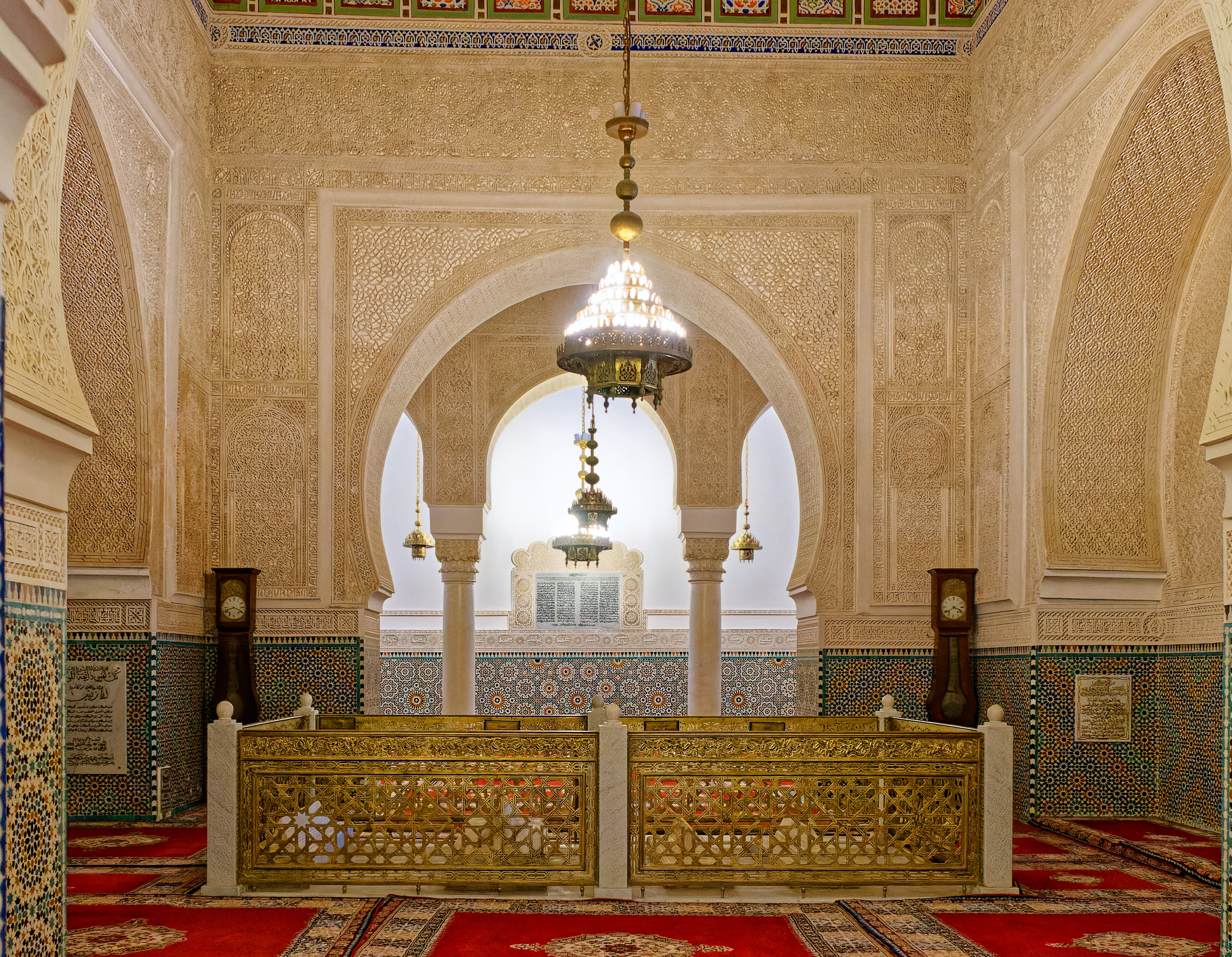
The tomb chamber of Moulay Isma'il

On the south side of the patio chamber is a large archway with ornate wooden doors which leads to a rectangular antechamber which precedes the actual mausoleum chamber. The mausoleum is a square chamber which holds the tombstones (mqabriyas) of Moulay Isma'il (died 1727), his son and successor Ahmad ad-Dhahabi (died 1729), and the later sultan Moulay Abd ar-Rahman (died 1859). On the south side of the mausoleum is another large reading room divided by a triple-arched arcade and containing book cabinets. Each of these chambers is covered with carved stucco decoration and also holds several bronze chandeliers. The royal tombstones are made of marble and are richly carved with Arabic calligraphic inscriptions and arabesque motifs in a style similar to the marble tombstones of the Saadian Tombs. The tomb chamber also holds two grandfather clocks which were gifts from King Louis XIV of France. The mausoleum is still visited today by Moroccans seeking baraka from Moulay Isma'il's tomb, in addition to being a significant tourist attraction in the city.

=== Dar al-Makhzen enclosure ===
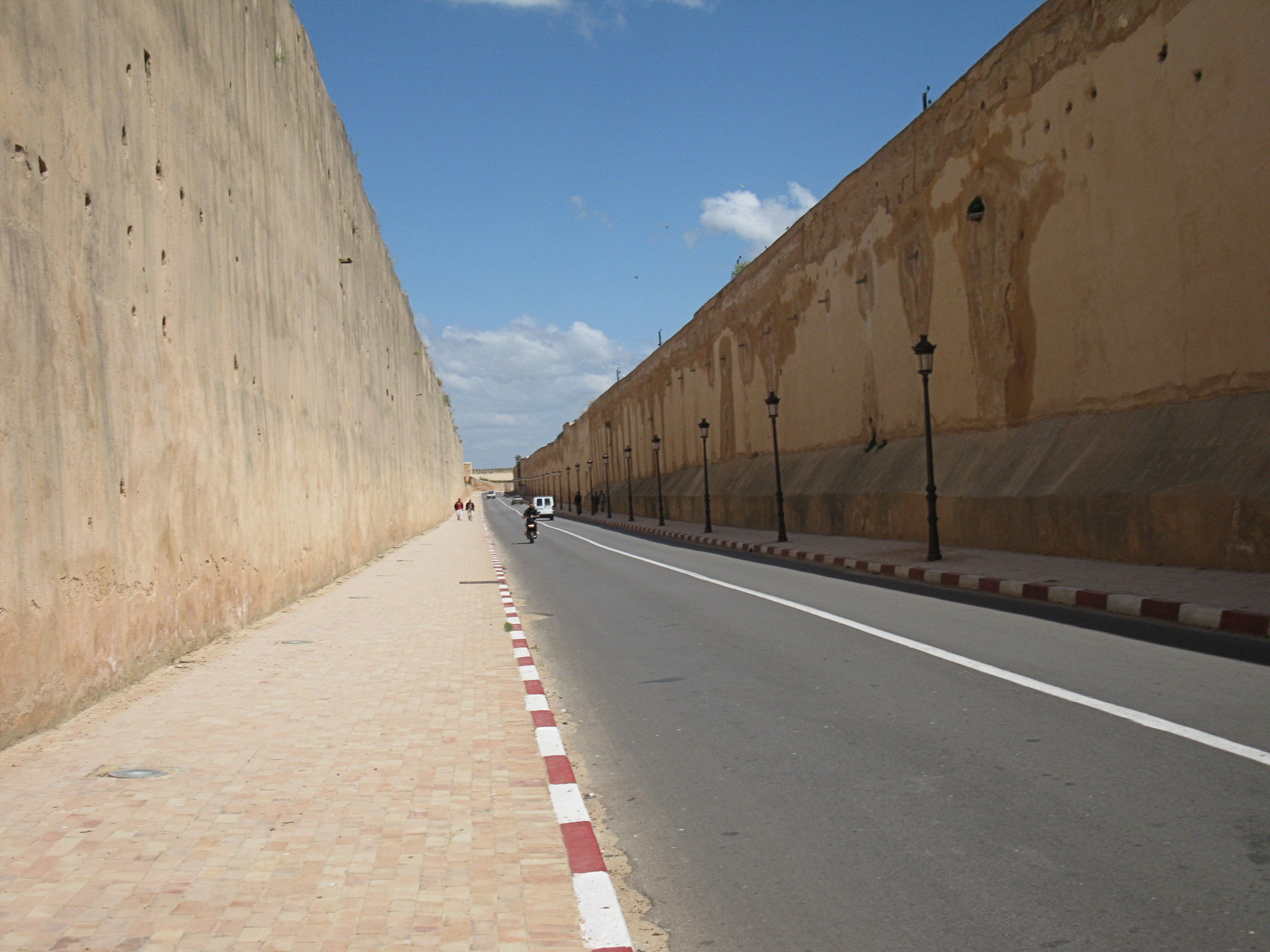
The asarag (avenue) between the walls on the north side of the Dar al-Makhzen

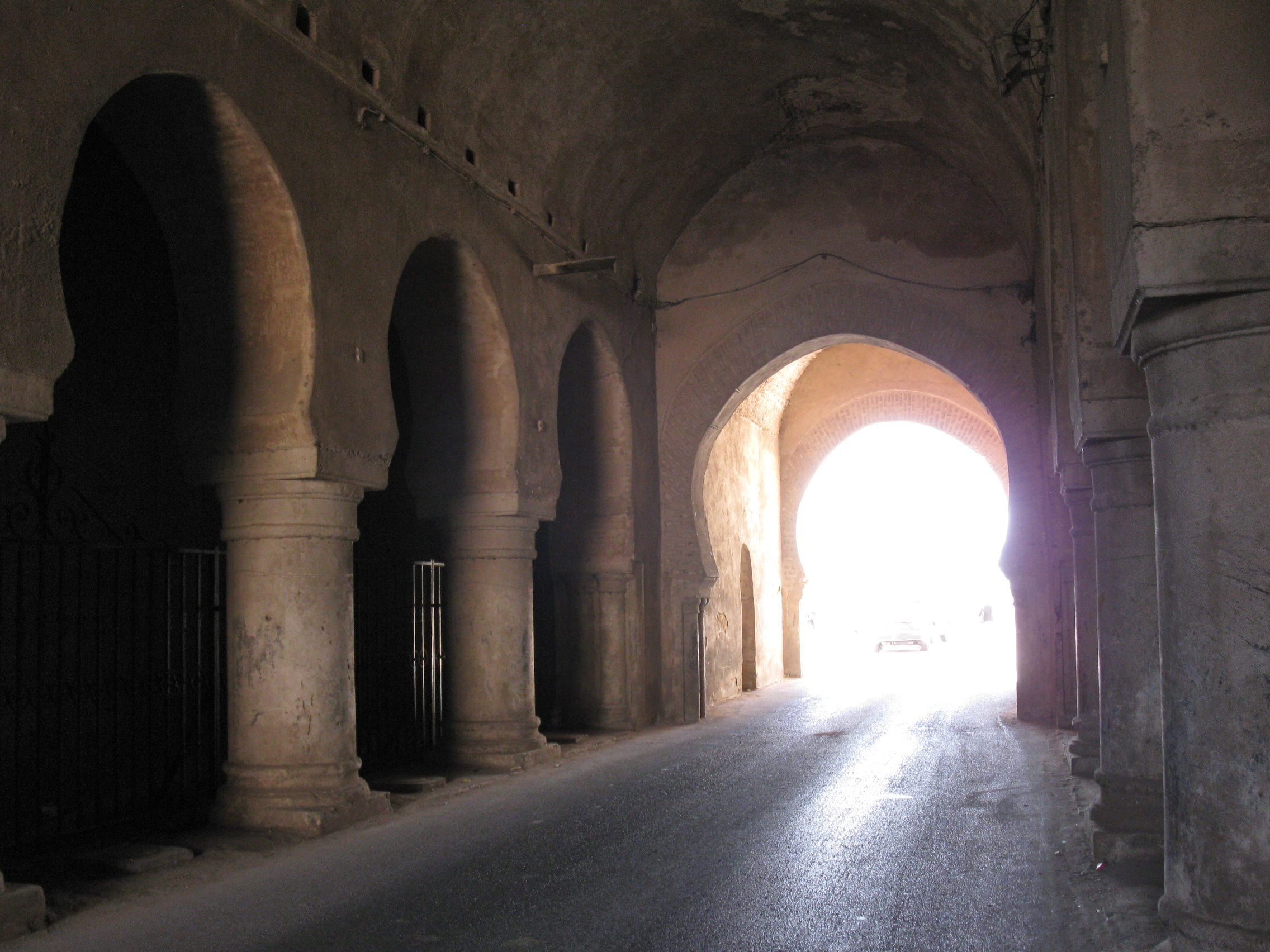
The interior of Bab ar-Ra'is, a gate passing through a bastion over the asarag avenue

The vast enclosure known as the Dar al-Makhzen today contained another set of palaces built by Moulay Isma'il, slightly later than the Dar al-Kebira. It covers a large quadrilateral area measuring roughly 1 km by 500 metres, containing approximately 60 hectares. The enclosure is separated from the Dar al-Kebira and the other structures to the north by a long esplanade (now occupied by a modern road) between two walls, known as the asarag (or asaraq). A long massive gateway, Bab ar-Ra'is ("Gate of the Captain"; known today also as Bab er-Rih, "Gate of the Wind") divides the asarag at its juncture with the outer wall of the Dar Kbira enclosure. The enclosure is in turn divided quite distinctly into two main sections. The larger western section is occupied mostly by the Bahriwiya Garden, now replaced by a modern golf course used by the Moroccan king. The northern edge of this section, however, was occupied by a long but narrow palace known as the Dar al-Madrasa ("House of the School"). The eastern section is a mix of gardens and palace structures, of which the main area is the Qasr al-Muhannasha ("Palace of the Labyrinth"; sometimes written Qasr al-Mhencha or Dar al-Mehencha). This eastern area is still used today as the official Dar al-Makhzen (royal palace) in Meknes and is off-limits to most visitors.

==== Dar al-Madrasa ====
The Dar al-Madrasa palace has a much more regular layout than the Dar al-Kebira, but it too appears to have been a private palace with apartments for the sultan and his family, bathhouses, a mosque or prayer hall, kitchens, and a long courtyard garden. The palace was entered via an ornate monumental gate on its north side. In addition to the Bahriwiya Garden, the rest of the walled enclosure here was also occupied by another garden called al-Tranghiya and by a small warehouse along the middle of its southern perimeter wall called al-Heri al-Saghir.

==== Qasr al-Muhannasha ====
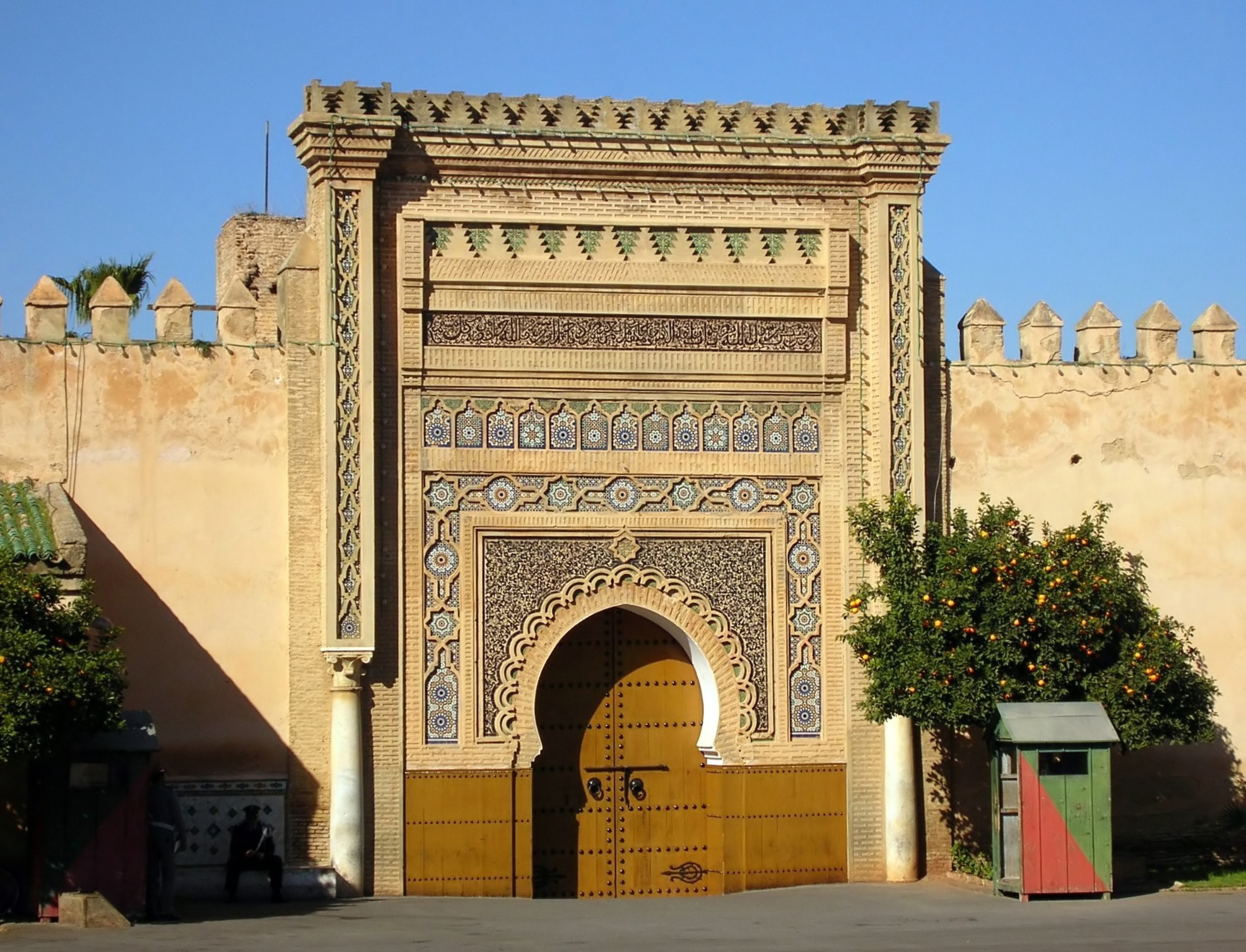
Bab al-Makhzen, the main eastern gate to the Qasr al-Muhannasha and the Dar al-Makhzen enclosure

The Qasr al-Muhannasha (sometimes spelled as "Ksar al-Mhanncha" or other variants) was more elaborate but organized in a more "rational" or regular way than the Dar al-Kebira. It was roughly divided into eight quadrilateral courtyards and gardens. The palace was used for official receptions as well as the imperial administration, with many offices for the staff of the makhzen. The complex was entered via what is today Bab al-Makhzen an outer gate to the east decorated with colourful tiles and zellij. The gate is preceded by a large open square which acted as another mechouar, which is also accessed via Bab an-Na'ura, a gate of the former Kasbah Hadrash. One of the main courtyards in the eastern end of the palace, near the gate, was the Riyad al-Muhannasha, a garden courtyard which contained a water basin with a labyrinth or serpentine shape which gave the rest of the palace its name. (Although scholar Marianne Barrucand, who authored the main study of the kasbah, disputes this etymology; the name may have rather been inspired by the palace's multi-part divisions.)

The first courtyard of the palace, when entered from the main eastern gate, was relatively austere bug contained a number of notable features. Just across from the main gate was a mosque which is unusual for having a layout clearly inspired by Ottoman mosques (a domed chamber adjoined by a thin minaret) but whose details and decoration are nonetheless Moroccan. It dates from the reign of Moulay Slimane between 1792 and 1822. Nearby is a building, the Dwiriya as-Sebaa ("House of the Lion"), which was a former menagerie (private zoo). Also in this area, in the northern corner of the courtyard, is a chancery or treasury known as the Dwiriya an-Nasr ("House of Glory/Victory") and which also contained the Qubbat an-Nasr ("Dome of Glory/Victory"), the sultan's own work office decorated with zellij and a painted wood ceiling.

The next courtyard to the north served as a court of honor centered around a large square pool fed by water channels. The courtyard is flanked on three sides by reception rooms and apartments situated on its central axes. The other parts of the palace further west consisted of garden enclosures. The northeastern or easternmost of these gardens was the 'Arsat ar-Rukham ("Garden of Marble"), a marble-paved riyad courtyard similar to the Badi Palace of Marrakesh, on the western side of which was the Qubbat as-Sawira (or Qubba as-Souira), a richly decorated domed pavilion on its western side which could be used for receptions. On the south side of the palace, within the same larger enclosure but walled off from the rest of the palace, was the Qasr al-Baqar, another former palace, and the Qasabat al-Marah, likely used to house troops or guards.

=== Heri as-Swani and the Sahrij Swani ===
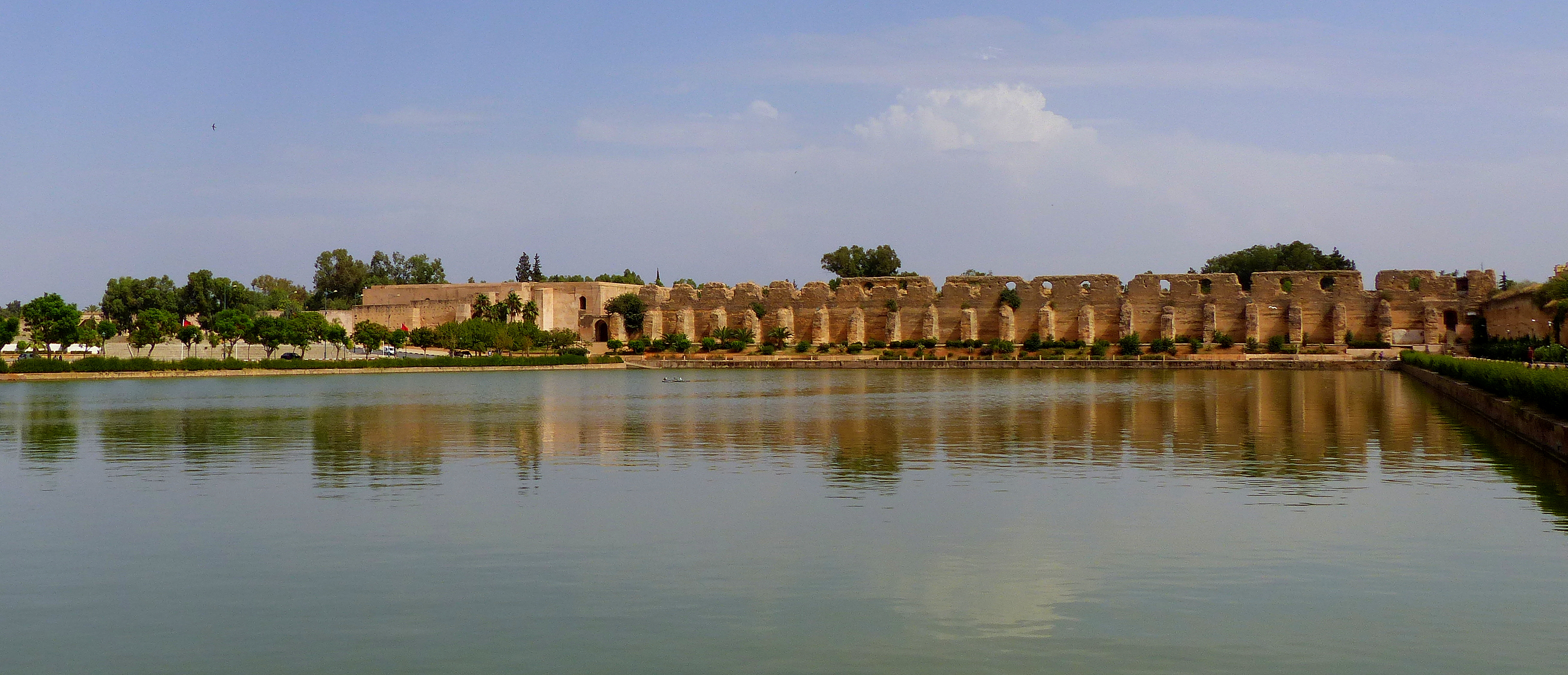
The Sahrij Swani (water basin) and, in the distance, the exterior walls of the semi-ruined Heri es-Swani (water supply structure and grain storage warehouse)

To the southeast of the Dar al-Makhzen palace enclosure was a large complex which served a mainly utilitarian and consisted of three major elements. The first part was an enormous structure known as the "House of the Ten Norias" or the Dar al-Ma ("House of Water"). It consisted of a large central chamber surrounded by smaller rooms around which, in turn, was a large vaulted corridor which gave access to 15 domed chambers. These domed chambers each held a noria or mechanical hydraulic system which drew water from a deep well reaching down to the phreatic table, via a series of pails or buckets chained together and raised by a horse-drawn wheel. This structure in turn provided water for the royal city through a system of terracotta or clay channels.

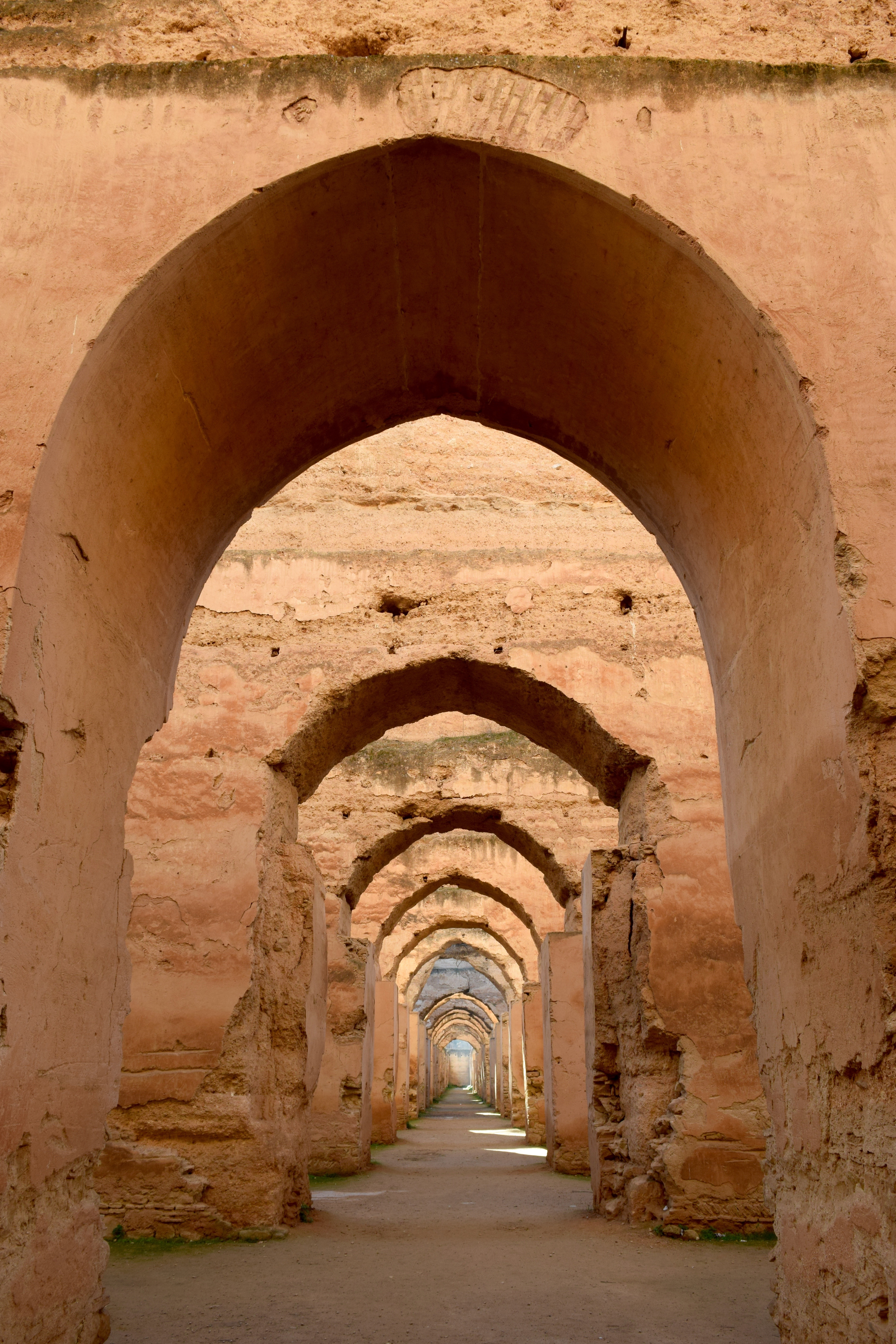
The arches of the granary in the Heri as-Swani

The second element of the complex was the Heri as-Swani or Heri es-Souani, a vast area of silos which were adjoined to the southwest side of the House of the Ten Norias. (The name is sometimes also applied to both structures together.) This structure measured 182 by 104 meters and was divided by 22 rows of thick arches between which ran vaulted corridors. The building is often mistakenly referred to as the "stables" or "royal stables" of Moulay Isma'il, but it was in fact an enormous grain storage warehouse which could stockpile supplies to withstand a long siege. Grain was delivered to the building by mules who climbed onto a roof terrace and dropped the grain directly into holes pierced above each vaulted corridor, though one interior corridor also remained free for interior circulation. Today, the vaulted roofs have collapsed and disappeared, leaving only the endless rows of arches which are nonetheless considered one of the most impressive sights in the city.

The third element is a vast water basin or artificial lake, the Sahrij Swani or Sahrij Souani (also sometimes called the Agdal Basin). The nearly rectangular basin measures 148.75 by 319 meters and is 1.2 meters deep on average. Although the basin was apparently also used for leisure by palace residents who bathed here or wandered around on small boats, its purpose appears to have been primarily utilitarian and integrated to the royal city's water supply. It was supplied with water by the adjacent House of the Ten Norias on its southeast side. In this regard it resembled the water basin in the Menara Gardens of Marrakesh. Possibly because of its importance, it was enclosed by its own two-meter-thick defensive wall, of which only a small section remains to the southwest (separating it from the Beni Mohammed neighbourhood beyond).

=== Outlying structures and areas ===
The kasbah occupies an extensive area beyond the main palaces, much of which was filled with extensive gardens (the Agdal), training grounds, or housing for troops. Much of the area today is home to more recent neighbourhoods.

==== Kasbah Hadrash ====
To the east of the Dar al-Makhzen, occupying a long and irregularly shaped area along the outer northeastern edge of the royal city, is the Kasbah Hadrash. This kasbah or enclosure was inhabited by soldiers and by the servants of the palace. It had direct access to the eastern mechouar of the palaces (the square in front of Bab al-Makhzen) via two gates, known together as Bab an-Na'ura. The kasbah also had the secondary function of providing an additional line of defense for the palaces along this part of the perimeter, as the mechouar here was more thinly protected from the outside than other parts of the perimeter.

==== Kasbah Beni Mohammed ====
The Kasbah Beni Mohammed was a vaguely defined area to the south and southwest of the royal city, near the Heri as-Swani and the Heri al-Mansur, which was given over to the Beni Mohammed tribe, one of the sultan's guich tribes. Today it is a residential district. An area near here was also occupied by a set of gardens, the Jnan as-Swani, whose location is also vaguely defined but comprised one of the many gardens of the royal city.

==== Heri al-Mansur ====
Between 1721 and 1725 Moulay Isma'il built yet another palace on the far southern perimeter of the Kasbah, one of the last constructions of his reign. It is known as the Heri al-Mansur ("Granary/silo of Victory") or also as Dar al-Mansur or Qasr al-Mansur ("Palace of Victory"). It consists of a massive building which seems to have served as palace, fortress, and granary or warehouse. The basement was taken up by storage rooms while the upper floor held reception rooms for the palace with views over nearby gardens. A great octagonal hall stands at the building's center.

==== The Royal Stables ====
Next to the Heri al-Mansur were the extensive Royal Stables of Moulay Isma'il (frequently misidentified with the Heri es-Souani further north). The stables consisted of two arcades (rows of arches) containing horse stalls stretching in parallel for about 1200 metres. At the middle, between them and open to the sky, was a water canal which provided the stables and the horses with water. The stables could reputedly hold up to 12,000 horses. Almost nothing of these stables have survived today, however they were described in writing by contemporary observers such as Père Busnot, who called them one of the most impressive elements of the palace city.

==== Er-Roua Mosque ====
The er-Roua Mosque is located slightly northwest of the Heri al-Mansur and was built on the orders of Sultan Muhammad ibn Abdallah (ruled between 1757 and 1790). It the largest mosque in Meknes, covering an area of 4,930 square metres (53,100 sq ft). The mosque consists of a large square courtyard (sahn) measuring 53 meters per side, and an interior prayer hall to the southeast divided into 4 transverse naves by three rows of horseshoe arches. At the middle of the courtyard is a large water basin and fountain, while at its northern corner stands the minaret. The mosque has three entrances arranged symmetrically on the central axes of the courtyard. On the mosque's northeast side is a long triangular courtyard which held a madrasa. The madrasa had sleeping cells for students and its own small square prayer hall at its eastern end. Aside from the mihrab, the mosque has very little decoration, possibly a reflection of the sultan's Wahhabist tendencies in his later life. The sahn's larger proportions compared to the prayer hall and its lack of a surrounding gallery mark a step in the evolution of new mosques during the Alaouite period and may even reflect the influence of a non-Moroccan architect.

==== Dar al-Bayda ====
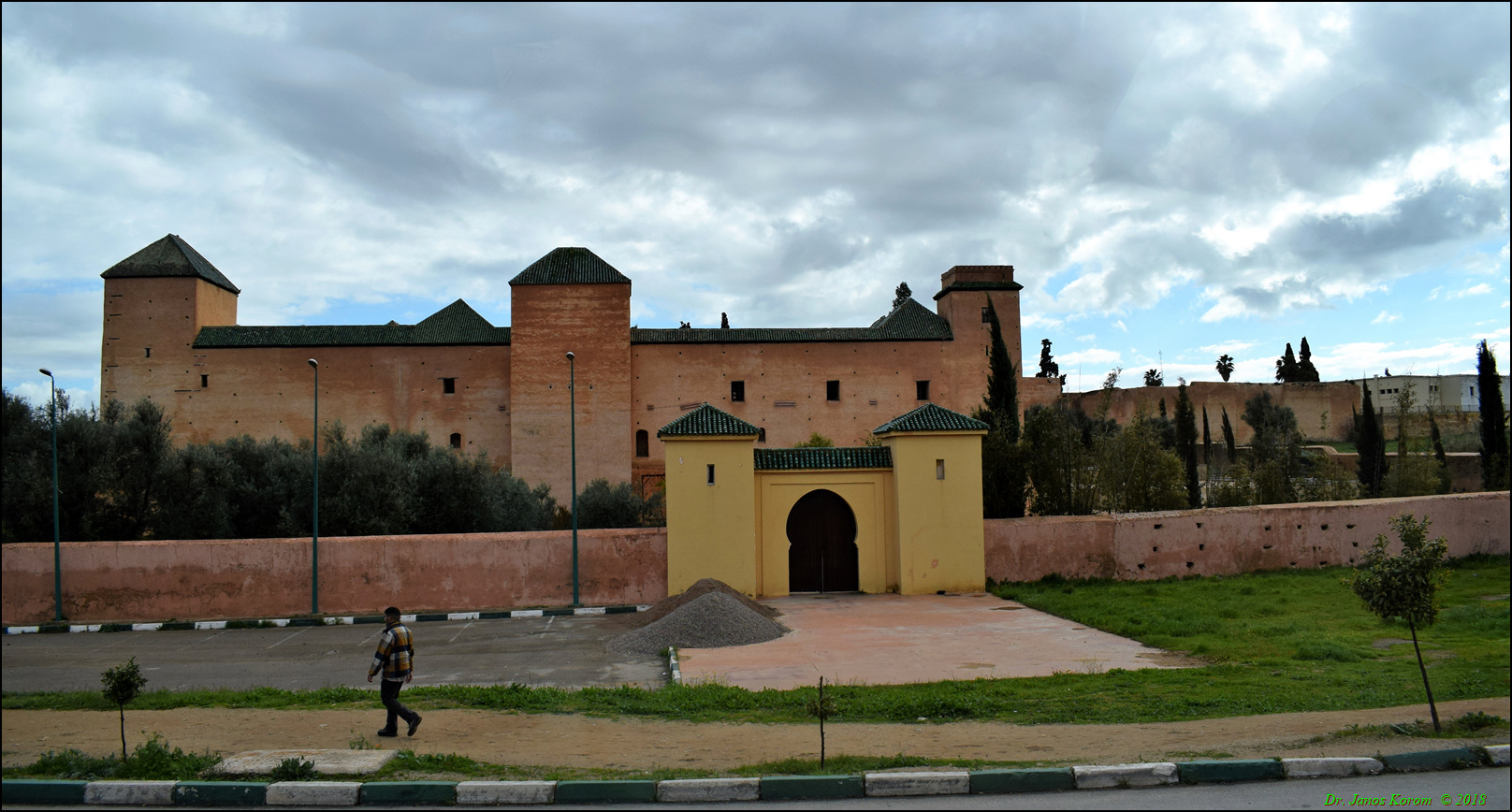
Exterior of the Dar al-Bayda Palace, now a part of the Royal Military Academy of Meknes

Sultan Muhammad ibn Abdallah also built a new palace out to the south, between the Heri es-Swani and the Heri al-Mansur known as Dar al-Bayda ("White House"; also spelled Dar al-Beida). The palace was probably inspired by a palace of the same name built by Muhammad ibn Abdallah in the Agdal Gardens of Marrakesh. Its architect was Ahmad al-Inglizi, who worked on many other projects across Morocco. It took about 15 years to build. It had a rectangular floor plan and thick outer walls with square towers at its corners. The interior was dominated by a large rectangular courtyard and a smaller rectangular courtyard on its southwest side. Around these were various rooms and galleries, including a main audience pavilion where the sultan could receive guests. Located amidst the southern gardens of the kasbah, it was later converted to a military academy (Meknes Royal Military Academy) and accompanied by open training grounds for the military; a status it maintains today.

== See also ==
- List of Moroccan royal residences
