= List of monuments in Meknes =

This is a list of monuments that are classified by the Moroccan ministry of culture around Meknes.

== Monuments and sites in Meknes ==
Image		Name	Location	Coordinates	Identifier
	Upload Photo	Agdal Basin	Meknes	33°52'53.573"N, 5°33'36.752"W	pc_architecture/sanae:040001
	Upload Photo	Meknes Royal Military Academy	Meknes	33°52'44.526"N, 5°33'25.326"W	pc_architecture/idpcm:D4D4D8
	Upload Photo	Dar el Kbira	Meknes	34°4'4.616"N, 4°58'0.473"W	pc_architecture/sanae:320120
	Upload Photo	Heri es-Swani	Meknes	33°52'49.926"N, 5°33'26.975"W	pc_architecture/idpcm:83DF9
	Upload Photo	Dar Al Makhzen (Meknes)	Meknes	33°53'14.161"N, 5°33'16.031"W	pc_architecture/sanae:320121
	Upload Photo	Koubat Al Khayatine	Meknes	33°53'27.377"N, 5°33'53.996"W	pc_architecture/sanae:320004
	Upload Photo	Kara Prison	Meknes	33°53'28.064"N, 5°33'52.646"W	pc_architecture/idpcm:84B
	Upload Photo	El Hedim Square	Meknes	33°53'35.250"N, 5°33'55.303"W	pc_architecture/idpcm:B05E0
	Upload Photo	Bab Mansour	Meknes	33°53'33.4"N, 5°33'52.7"W	pc_architecture/sanae:390003
	Upload Photo	Bou Inania Madrasa	Meknes	33°53'42.7"N, 5°33'55.0"W	pc_architecture/sanae:270009
	Upload Photo	Dar Jamaï palace	Meknes	33°53'37.561"N, 5°33'59.605"W	pc_architecture/sanae:320137
	Upload Photo	Medina of Meknes	Meknes	33°53'41.485"N, 5°33'52.132"W	pc_architecture/sanae:280005
	Upload Photo	Al-Tuta Mosque	Meknes	33°53'44.275"N, 5°34'0.696"W	pc_architecture/sanae:310002
	Upload Photo	Bab Akbet Ziadine	Meknes	33°53'46.367"N, 5°33'41.335"W	pc_architecture/idpcm:C9F6AF
	Upload Photo	Mausoleum Sidi Ali Mennoun	Meknes		pc_architecture/idpcm:8BB735
	Upload Photo	Zaouia Dghoghia	Meknes		pc_architecture/idpcm:3D599E
	Upload Photo	Zaouia Sidi Abdelkrim Radi	Meknes		pc_architecture/idpcm:AB4341
	Upload Photo	Darwah Hotel	Meknes		pc_architecture/idpcm:B1FCFF
	Upload Photo	Al-Fourssan bridge	Meknes	33°52'36.912"N, 5°33'44.791"W	pc_architecture/sanae:380030
	Upload Photo	Zaouia Hmadcha	Meknes		pc_architecture/idpcm:D56DC1
	Upload Photo	Agdal (Meknes)	Meknes	33°52'44.666"N, 5°32'42.486"W	pc_architecture/sanae:020003
	Upload Photo	The door of Agdal	Meknes		pc_architecture/idpcm:81D65
	Upload Photo	Aqueduc Bab Berdaïne	Meknes		pc_architecture/sanae:030014
	Upload Photo	Bab Nouara	Meknes	33°53'6.014"N, 5°33'9.565"W	pc_architecture/sanae:390004
	Upload Photo	Bab Al Anouar	Meknes	33°53'24.306"N, 5°34'11.039"W	pc_architecture/idpcm:9B288F
	Upload Photo	The door of Al Aoudat	Meknes		pc_architecture/idpcm:C437D9
	Upload Photo	Bab Al Qazdir	Meknes	33°52'0.012"N, 5°32'36.830"W	pc_architecture/sanae:390007
	Upload Photo	Bab Berrima	Meknes	33°53'37.939"N, 5°34'7.414"W	pc_architecture/sanae:390111
	Upload Photo	Bab Dar Lakbira	Meknes	33°53'27.125"N, 5°33'42.448"W	pc_architecture/idpcm:A43300
	Upload Photo	Bab Filala	Meknes	33°53'30.90991"N, 5°33'50.04000"W	pc_architecture/sanae:390112
	Upload Photo	Bab Kbeich	Meknes	33°51'41.400"N, 5°33'4.151"W	pc_architecture/idpcm:86E62
	Upload Photo	Bab Lalla Khadra	Meknes	33°52'53.911"N, 5°32'37.784"W	pc_architecture/idpcm:7386A0
	Upload Photo	Bab Nouara	Meknes	33°53'6.014"N, 5°33'9.565"W	pc_architecture/sanae:390004
	Upload Photo	Belqari Tower	Meknes	33°53'15.162"N, 5°34'3.274"W	pc_architecture/idpcm:23E6FE
	Upload Photo	Dar Al Bacha Hammou	Meknes		pc_architecture/idpcm:1A6CA
	Upload Photo	El Adoul Madrasa	Meknes		pc_architecture/sanae:270024
	Upload Photo	Filalia Madarsa	Meknes	33°53'41.266"N, 5°33'52.027"W	pc_architecture/sanae:270010
	Upload Photo	Bab Moulay Ismaïl	Meknes	33°53'26.268"N, 5°33'49.255"W	pc_architecture/sanae:390117
	Upload Photo	Bab Jdid	Meknes	33°53'51.176"N, 5°34'16.061"W	pc_architecture/sanae:390019
	Upload Photo	Djenan Ben Halima	Meknes	33°52'55.373"N, 5°33'19.649"W	pc_architecture/sanae:180001
	Upload Photo	Moulay Ismaïl Hospital	Meknes	33°53'33.590"N, 5°32'44.344"W	pc_architecture/idpcm:9D9F21
	Upload Photo	Jnan Ben Hlima	Meknes	33°52'54.419"N, 5°33'19.933"W	pc_architecture/idpcm:3E6C7
	Upload Photo	Bab Beni Mhamed	Meknes	33°53'8.048"N, 5°33'55.192"W	pc_architecture/idpcm:AFC6A1
	Upload Photo	Bab Bou Ameir	Meknes	33°53'39.221"N, 5°33'27.698"W	pc_architecture/sanae:390005
	Upload Photo	Louis hotel hospital	Meknes	33°53'19.410"N, 5°31'24.139"W	pc_architecture/sanae:170001
	Upload Photo	Bab El-Baradeiyin Mosque	Meknes	33°53'58.992"N, 5°34'3.000"W	pc_architecture/idpcm:B36DAA
	Upload Photo	Bab Berdieyinne	Meknes	33°54'3.895"N, 5°34'5.941"W	pc_architecture/idpcm:69C9CB
	Upload Photo	Borj El Ma	Meknes	33°53'17.160"N, 5°33'14.252"W	pc_architecture/idpcm:2F475C
	Upload Photo	Borj Bibi Aïcha	Meknes	33°52'9.595"N, 5°32'22.999"W	pc_architecture/idpcm:12B05
	Upload Photo	Bab Zine Al Abidine	Meknes	33°53'36.827"N, 5°33'58.903"W	pc_architecture/idpcm:91CD80
	Upload Photo	Bab Siba	Meknes	33°53'38.1005"N, 5°34'9.3468"W	pc_architecture/idpcm:B1F41
	Upload Photo	Bab Qasbat Hadrach	Meknes	33°52'51.337"N, 5°32'34.818"W	pc_architecture/idpcm:AF2E8
	Upload Photo	Bab Bettioui	Meknes	33°52'14.214"N, 5°33'48.748"W	pc_architecture/idpcm:CAA24
	Upload Photo	Bab Al Mers	Meknes	33°53'25.991"N, 5°33'19.757"W	pc_architecture/sanae:390008
	Upload Photo	Pavillon El Khaïma	Meknes	33°52'22.814"N, 5°32'29.242"W	pc_architecture/sanae:340004
	Upload Photo	Pavillon El Khaïma	Meknes	33°52'22.814"N, 5°32'29.242"W	pc_architecture/sanae:340004
	Upload Photo	Koubat Al Khayatine	Meknes	33°53'27.377"N, 5°33'53.996"W	pc_architecture/sanae:320004
	Upload Photo	Heri Al Manssour (Palace)	Meknes	33°52'4.724"N, 5°33'35.798"W	pc_architecture/sanae:320008
	Upload Photo	Msid Sidi Kaddour Al Alami	Meknes	33°53'40.063"N, 5°33'46.782"W	pc_architecture/sanae:310006
	Upload Photo	Msid Sidi Chirch	Meknes	33°53'40.063"N, 5°33'46.782"W	pc_architecture/sanae:310005
	Upload Photo	Msid Abdellah Ben Qdad	Meknes	33°53'40.063"N, 5°33'46.782"W	pc_architecture/idpcm:CCBD2
	Upload Photo	Msid Filala (Meknes)	Meknes	33°53'41.266"N, 5°33'52.027"W	pc_architecture/sanae:310003
	Upload Photo	Msid El Mohtasseb	Meknes	33°52'50.682"N, 5°34'21.842"W	pc_architecture/idpcm:4EEA80
	Upload Photo	Foundouk El Hanna	Meknes	33°52'25.082"N, 5°32'28.378"W	pc_architecture/sanae:110001
	Upload Photo	Rouah stable	Meknes	33°52'22.814"N, 5°32'29.242"W	pc_architecture/sanae:090001
	Upload Photo	Zaouia Lalla Aïcha Al adouia	Meknes	33°52'52.784"N, 5°32'49.733"W	pc_architecture/sanae:120006
	Upload Photo	Seqqaia Touta	Meknes	33°53'44.693"N, 5°34'0.772"W	pc_architecture/sanae:120010
	Upload Photo	Seqqaia Sidi Qaddour Al Alami	Meknes	33°53'46.979"N, 5°33'58.226"W	pc_architecture/sanae:120009
	Upload Photo	Seqqaia Sbaa Anabeb	Meknes	33°52'12.176"N, 5°34'47.935"W	pc_architecture/sanae:120008
	Upload Photo	Seqqaia Jannat Lamane (Meknes)	Meknes	33°53'53.383"N, 5°34'7.255"W	pc_architecture/idpcm:1DA9
	Upload Photo	Seqqaïa El-Haddadine	Meknes	33°53'39.714"N, 5°33'59.753"W	pc_architecture/sanae:120004
	Upload Photo	Seqqaïa El-Adoul	Meknes	33°53'39.458"N, 5°33'56.311"W	pc_architecture/sanae:120005
	Upload Photo	Seqqaïa Djenah el Amane	Meknes	33°53'53.383"N, 5°34'7.255"W	pc_architecture/sanae:120016
	Upload Photo	Sahrij Souani	Meknes		pc_architecture/idpcm:895426
	Upload Photo	Kasbah of Hattane Meknes	Meknes		pc_architecture/idpcm:BC582
	Upload Photo	Kasbah Hadrach Meknes	Meknes		pc_architecture/idpcm:787865
	Upload Photo	Kasbah Kedara Meknes	Meknes		pc_architecture/idpcm:F09C1E
	Upload Photo	Bab El Khemis	Meknes	33°53'29.04709"N, 5°34'20.66610"W	pc_architecture/sanae:390009
	Upload Photo	Bab Ennaoura	Meknes		pc_architecture/idpcm:39E4EC
