= 2016 Alboran Sea earthquake =

Earthquake off the coast of Morocco

- Location within Morocco Location within Spain
- UTC time: 2016-01-25 04:22:02
- ISC event: 608278395
- USGS-ANSS: ComCat
- Local date: 25 January 2016
- Local time: 05:22:02
- Magnitude: 6.3–6.4 M_{w} 6.3 M_{s}
- Depth: 12 km (7.5 mi)
- Epicenter: 35.649°N 3.682°W
- Type: Strike-slip
- Areas affected: Morocco & Spain
- Max. intensity: MMI VI (Strong)
- Foreshocks: One recorded
- Aftershocks: >2350 recorded from 25 Jan to 13 May
- Casualties: 1 dead, ~30 injured

The 2016 Alboran Sea earthquake struck offshore, north northeast of Al Hoceïma, Morocco in the Strait of Gibraltar on 25 January at 04:22:02 UTC, or roughly 05:22:02 West Africa Time. At its strongest in the Alboran Sea, the earthquake measured 6.3–6.4 on the moment magnitude scale (M_{w}) at a shallow hypocenter depth of 12 km (7.5 mi). Assigned a maximum Modified Mercalli scale intensity of VI (Strong), the earthquake caused one fatality, injuries to at least 30 persons, and moderate damage in Morocco and Spain.

== Background ==
The Strait of Gibraltar sits atop a convergent boundary where the Nubian plate, a fragment of the African plate, is colliding with the Iberian plate (part of the Eurasian plate) at a rate of 5 mm/yr. The northwest–southeast convergence between the two plates results in the occurrence of active shallow faulting offshore and onshore. The Trans-Alboran Shear Zone, a seismic zone measuring 500-km-long by 80-km-wide accommodates, the interaction between the two plates. Seismic activity associated with these shallow faults is characterized by their small to moderately size in magnitudes with thrust, strike-slip or normal focal mechanisms. Historical earthquakes associated with the seismogenic zone have been locally devastating, causing large loss of life. The most damaging earthquake in recent history occurred on 24 February 2004 when a M_{w} 6.4 quake struck Al Hoceïma, killing at least 628 people. Major events also occurred in 1804, 1910, and 1994. The deadly 1522 Almería earthquake in southern Spain is associated with shallow faulting within this seismic zone.

Besides the presence of shallow seismicity, intermediate to deep-focus earthquakes have occurred in the surrounding area as well. The largest deep-focus quake was an M_{w} 7.8 which struck the Province of Málaga in Andalusia, Spain at a great depth of 626.2 km (389.1 mi). Little is known about the origins of deep-focus earthquakes beneath the Alboran Sea, with theories suggesting an oceanic lithosphere is subducting to the east along the Gibraltar Arc at a near-vertical dip at depth, or some complex slab delamination processes.

== Earthquake ==
The M_{w} 6.3–6.4 mainshock resulted from shallow left-lateral strike-slip faulting along the 100-km-long Al-Idrissi Fault. The mainshock ruptured for a length of approximately 21 km (13 mi) in a northeast direction at a velocity of 3.0 km/s. A maximum fault displacement of 0.6 meters was estimated near the hypocenter of the quake on the fault.

=== Foreshock and aftershocks ===
Four days prior (21 January) to the mainshock, an M_{wr} 5.1 earthquake struck with an epicenter southeast of the mainshock at a depth of 10 km (6.2 mi). The foreshock caused no damage but was felt III (Weak) at its maximum in Málaga, Spain. It was also felt in Nador and Tangier, Morocco. This foreshock was the first recorded in the 2016 Alboran earthquake sequence.

Twenty-four aftershocks measuring 4.0 or greater were recorded by the U.S. Geological Survey. Four of the aftershocks had magnitudes greater than 5.0, with the largest measuring a 5.3 just over ten minutes after the mainshock. The aftershocks were strong enough to be felt in Morocco and Spain. The focal mechanisms for the largest aftershocks featured shallow reverse faulting. A total of more than 2350 aftershocks were recorded from 25 January to 13 May the same year, 197 of them greater or equal to magnitude 3.0.

== Impact ==
In Al Hoceima, a 12-year-old boy suffered a heart attack caused by panic during the earthquake, and died after arriving at a hospital. A woman was injured after jumping from a two-storey building for fears that it would collapse.

In Melilla, a Spanish city in North Africa, emergency services received over 200 calls from residents reporting damage to homes and buildings. The power supply was disrupted in some areas in the city. At least 26 people were treated for their injuries that consisted of mainly cuts and bruises. According to the Mayor-President of Melilla, Juan José Imbroda, schools in the city were closed for damage inspections. Damage including concrete blocks falling from an apartment building was reported in the city. The homes of 160 residents sustained serious damage but they were occupied shortly after the quake. The total damage in the city is estimated at €12 million.

== See also ==
- List of earthquakes in 2016
- List of earthquakes in Morocco
- List of earthquakes in Spain
