= 1624 Fez earthquake =

- Location within Morocco
- Local date: 11 May 1624
- Local time: 03:00–04:00
- Magnitude: 6.0 M_{w}
- Epicentre: 34.1°N 5.1°W
- Areas affected: Morocco
- Max. intensity: MSK-64 VIII (Damaging)-MSK-64 IX (Destructive)
- Casualties: Thousands dead

In 1624 the city of Fez in northern Morocco was devastated by a major earthquake between three and four in the morning of 11 May. It had an estimated magnitude of 6.0 M_{w} and a maximum felt intensity of VIII–IX on the MSK scale. The earthquake caused severe damage in Fez and the surrounding area. It was felt as far away as Seville in southern Spain. Thousands of people died.

== Tectonic setting ==
Fez lies within the southern part of the Rif, which forms part of the Gibraltar Arc. The Rif and the Betic Cordillera were formed during the Cenozoic, initially as a result of convergence between the African plate and the Eurasian plate. The collisional structure was modified during the Miocene by a combination of westward migration of the mountain belt and extension that resulted in formation of the Alboran Sea The extension may be a result of back-arc basin formation related to subduction during the Miocene. Although it remains unclear whether there is still active subduction, the convergence continues at a rate of 4 mm per year in a NW–SE direction. The most external part of the Rif is formed of a series of thrust faults and related folds, referred to as the Prerif.

== Earthquake ==
The magnitude of this event has been estimated from the distribution of seismic intensities, giving a mean value of 6.0 M_{w}. From a description of damage in contemporary reports, the seismic intensity associated with this earthquake is estimated to have been VIII–IX at Fez, VII–VIII at Meknès and Sefrou, VII at Beni Zeroual, VI–VII at Taza, VI at Beni Ouriaghel, P.V. Gomera and Salé, V at Melilla and IV at Safi.

The Saïss basin lies to the south of Fez. There is evidence from seismites found in the lacustrian and fluvial sediments deposited in this basin that the area has been affected by active tectonics since at least the Late Pliocene (3.6 million years ago). The Southern Rif Front, which borders the basin, is formed of a series of faults and related folds. The western part of this fault zone is a likely location for the rupture that caused the 1624 earthquake.

== Damage ==
Fez suffered the most severe effects of the earthquake. Very few buildings were unaffected, with many collapsing. The damage was greatest in the older part of the city, Fes el Bali. This difference in damage is reflected in the reported number of casualties, with over 2,500 dead in Fes el Bali compared to only eleven in the newer district of Fes el-Jdid and none in the Mellah. At Meknès, two towers were destroyed and two fatalities were reported, while at Sefrou four houses were ruined but there were no deaths.

== See also ==
- 1755 Meknes earthquake – badly damaged Meknes and Fez
- List of earthquakes in Morocco
