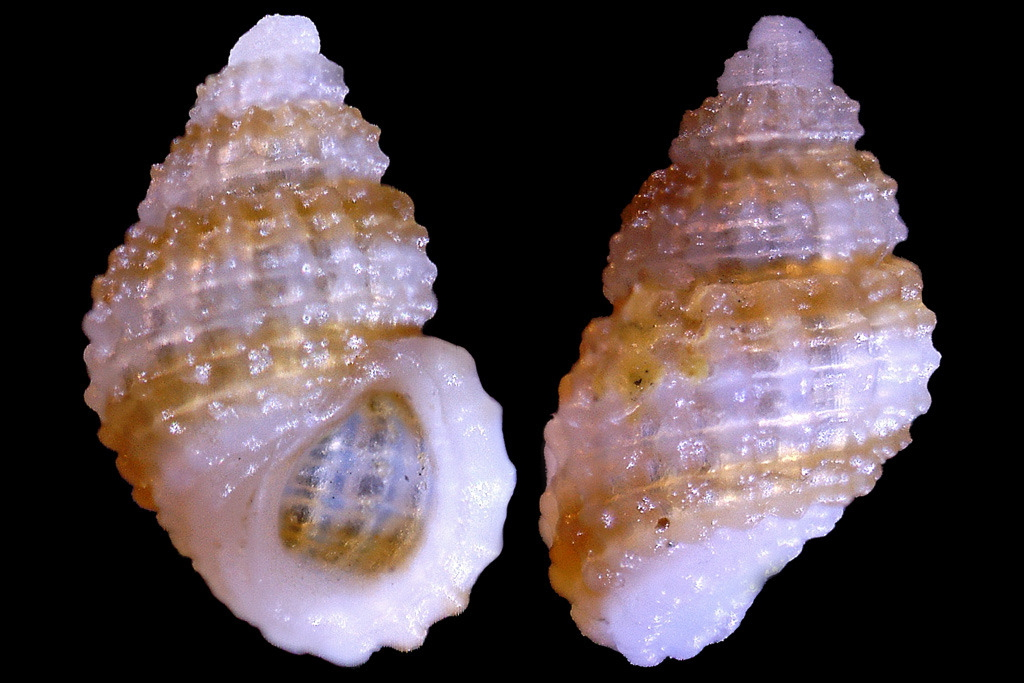
- Shell of Alvania nestaresi

Scientific classification
- Kingdom: Animalia
- Phylum: Mollusca
- Class: Gastropoda
- Subclass: Caenogastropoda
- Order: Littorinimorpha
- Family: Rissoidae
- Genus: Alvania
- Species: A. nestaresi

Binomial name
- Alvania nestaresi Oliverio & Amati, 1990

= Alvania nestaresi =

Species of gastropod

Alvania nestaresi is a species of minute sea snail, a marine gastropod mollusk or micromollusk in the family Rissoidae.

== Distribution ==
This species occurs in the Alboran Sea, Western Mediterranean Sea; also off Greece.
