= List of earthquakes in Morocco =

Epicentres of major earthquakes in Morocco with year of occurrence since 1900

This is a list of significant earthquakes that either had their epicentre in Morocco or had a significant impact in the country.

== Seismicity in Morocco ==
Northern Morocco lies close to the boundary between the African and Eurasian plates, the Azores–Gibraltar transform fault. This zone of right-lateral strike-slip becomes transpressional at its eastern end, with the development of large thrust faults. To the east of the Strait of Gibraltar, in the Alboran Sea, the boundary becomes collisional in type. Most of the seismicity in Morocco is related to movement on that plate boundary, with the greatest seismic hazard in the north of the country, close to the boundary.

== Earthquakes ==
Date	Region	MMI	Mag.	Deaths	Injuries	Note	Ref
2023-09-08	Marrakesh-Safi	IX	6.8 M_{w}	2,960	5,674	Extreme damage	
2019-11-17	Drâa-Tafilalet	VI	5.0 M_{w}			Various houses damaged in Midelt	
2016-01-25	Al Hoceima	VI	6.3 M_{w}	1	15	Moderate damage	
2007-02-12	Portugal, Morocco	VI	6.0 M_{w}			Minor damage	
2004-02-24	Al Hoceima	IX	6.3 M_{w}	628–631	926	Severe damage	
1994-05-26	Al Hoceima	VI	6.0 M_{w}		1	Several buildings damaged	
1992-10-23	Errachidia	VI	5.5 M_{w}	2		Damage in Erfoud and Rissani	
1969-02-28	Portugal, Morocco	VII	7.8 M_{w}	13	80	Moderate damage	
1960-02-29	Agadir	X	5.8 M_{w}	12,000–15,000	12,000	Extreme damage	
1909-01-29	Tétouan			100			
1761-03-31	Portugal, Morocco, Spain	VII–IX	8.5 M_{s}	Unknown	Unknown	Tsunami	
1755-11-27	Meknes	IX	6.5–7.0 M_{w}	15,000		Severe damage	
1755-11-01	Portugal, Morocco, Spain	VII–VIII	7.7–9.0 M_{w}	Several thousand		Considerable damage / tsunami	
1624-05-11	Fez	IX	6.0 M_{w}	Thousands		Extreme damage	
1522-09-22	Spain, Morocco	VIII–IX		Several hundred		Severe damage Epicenter in the Alboran Sea	
Note: Only damaging, injurious, or deadly events are listed.

== See also ==
- Geology of Morocco
