= 1755 earthquake =

The 1755 earthquake may refer to

- 1755 Lisbon earthquake (great, tsunami), off the coast of Portugal on November 1
  - or to a style of architecture following this event, Earthquake Baroque
- 1755 Cape Ann earthquake (tsunami), near the British Province of Massachusetts Bay (present-day Massachusetts, USA) on November 18
- 1755 Meknes earthquake (great, local), affecting Morocco, dated November 18–19 or November 27 by various sources

== See also ==
- List of historical earthquakes
