= Melanella scarifata =

Scientific classification
- Kingdom: Animalia
- Phylum: Mollusca
- Class: Gastropoda
- Subclass: Caenogastropoda
- Order: Littorinimorpha
- Family: Eulimidae
- Genus: Melanella
- Species: M. scarifata

Binomial name
- Melanella scarifata Gofas & Rueda, 2014

Species of gastropod

Melanella scarifata is a species of sea snail, a marine gastropod mollusk in the family Eulimidae.

== Description ==
The length of the shell attains 5.1 mm, its diameter 1.9 mm.

== Distribution ==
This species occurs in the Spanish part of the Alboran Sea.
