= Ait Kamara =

Village in Morocco

Coordinates: 35.1441°N 3.9869°W

Ait Kamara is a village located 18 kilometres (11 mi) south of the city of Al Hoceima, in the Ait Waryaghar's tribe, in the Rif region of Morocco. It was affected by the 2004 Al Hoceima earthquake. National Route 16 connects the village to Tetouan in the west. There is a nearby commercial airport that has been used as a military airport for some time.

Many of the village inhabitants havemigrated to Europe in the 1980s.

A new football stadium is being built as is a new economic zone.
