= Heri es-Swani =

Historic monument in Meknes, Morocco

- هري السواني (Arabic)
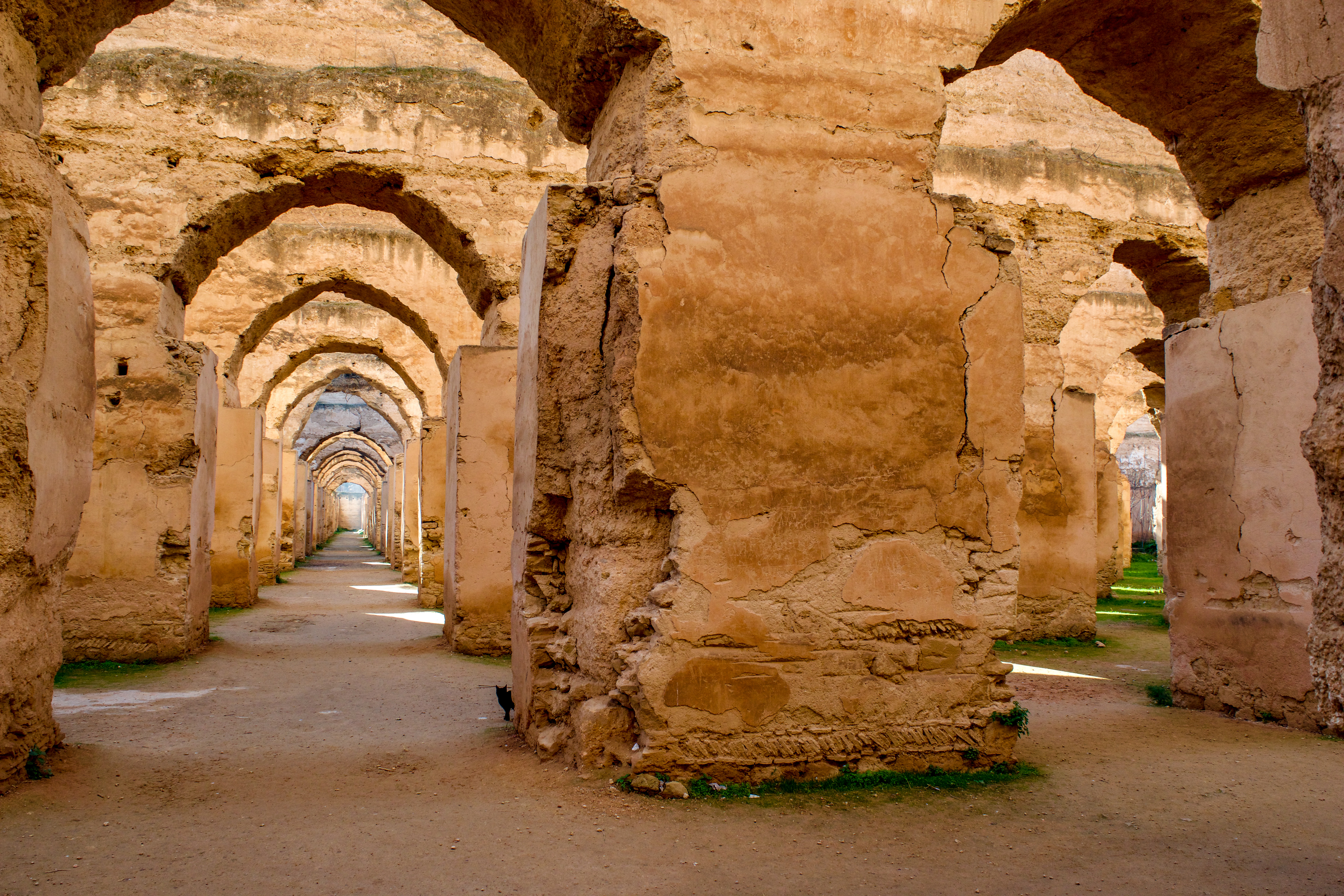
- Interior of the grain silos
- Interactive map of Heri es-Swani
- 33°52′48.8″N 5°33′28.5″W
- Type: granary, water supply structures
- Location: Meknes, Morocco

History
- Founder: Sultan Moulay Isma'il ibn Sharif
- Built: between 1672 and 1727

Site notes
- Architectural style: Moroccan

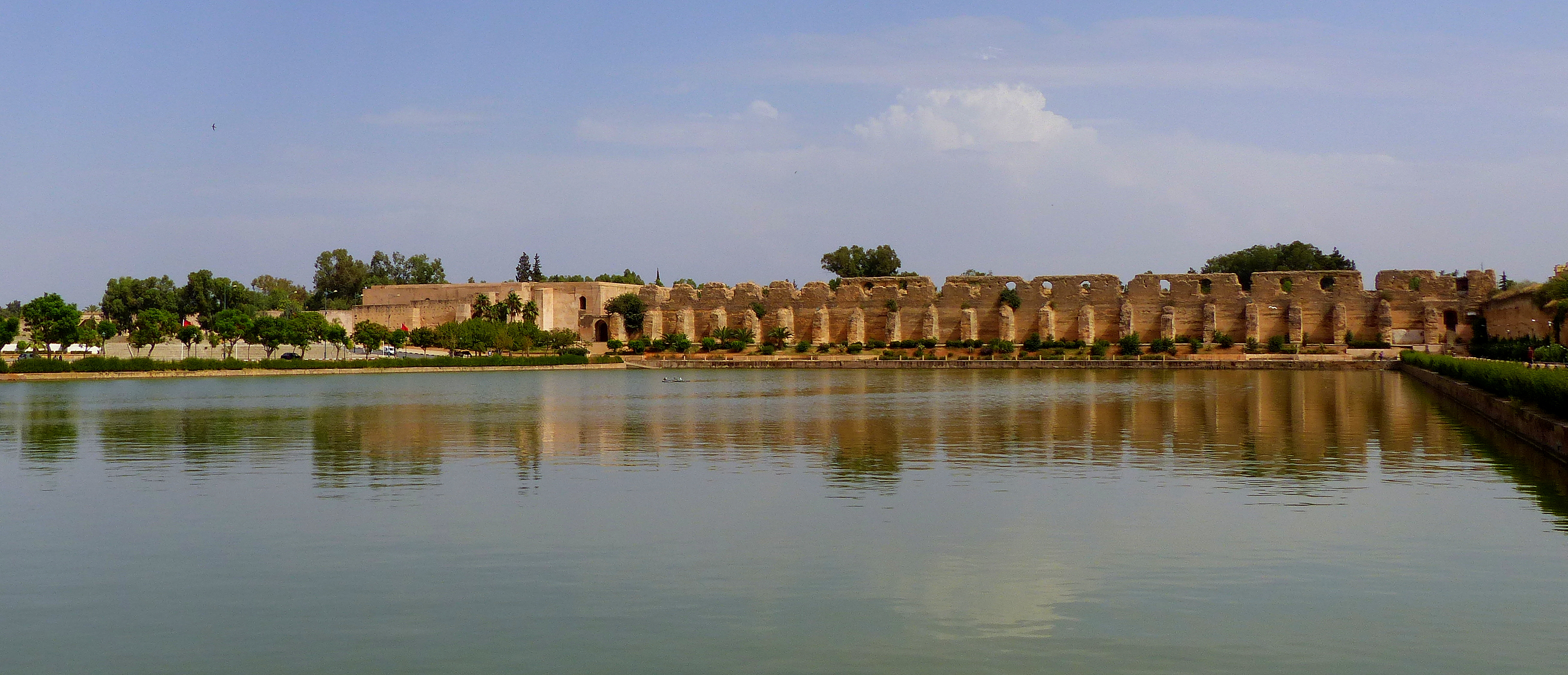
The Sahrij Swani (water basin) and, in the distance, the exterior walls of the Heri es-Swani compound

The Heri es-Swani or Heri es-Souani (Arabic: هري السواني, lit. 'silo of the norias'), sometimes also transliterated as Hury as-Swani or Hri Swani, is a historic monument in Meknes, Morocco. It was a massive structure that served as a granary or silo for the Imperial Kasbah built by Moulay Isma'il during his reign from 1672 to 1727. It was part of a larger compound of facilities which also included the attached House of the Ten Norias, which provided water for the palaces, and a large water basin nearby known as the Sahrij Swani or Agdal Basin. The name "Heri es-Swani" often applies to both the House of the Ten Norias and the silos, which are connected to each other and visited as a single attraction by tourists today. In popular usage the silos are often misidentified as the "Royal Stables", but those stables were in fact a different structure that existed further south.

== Historical background ==
Moulay Isma'il became sultan upon the death of his brother Moulay Rashid in 1672. Breaking with tradition, he chose to make Meknes as his capital. Here, he built a monumental imperial palace-city (kasbah) on the southwest side of the old city (the medina). It consisted of several distinct palace complexes and other facilities spread across a vast area enclosed by fortified walls. Work on the vast palace complex began as soon as his accession to the throne in 1672. In addition to its immense scale, the palace complex was also notable for its highly developed infrastructure. Its water supply was particularly sophisticated for the time, making use of an early version of indoor plumbing which distributed water to buildings throughout the Kasbah via canals and underground terracotta pipes. This water was drawn directly from the phreatic table in the House of the Ten Norias using a mechanical hydraulic system of chained buckets turned by a wheel. This water supply and underground plumbing system is considered to be a century ahead of the infrastructure found in contemporary European palaces and constructions.

Following Moulay Isma'il's death the political situation in Morocco degenerated into relative anarchy. His sons fought each other for power and his former 'abid army became the dominant power in the state, effectively ruling behind the throne. Meknes lost its status as capital and suffered damage in the 1755 earthquake. The city was neglected and many parts of the enormous imperial kasbah fell into disrepair. Today, a part of the kasbah, the Dar al-Makhzen, is still used by the King of Morocco and is off-limits to the public. Other sites, such as Moulay Isma'il's mausoleum and the Heri es-Swani, are open as religious sites or tourist attractions.

== Architecture ==
The main structure of the complex is divided into two components: the House of the Ten Norias and the Heri es-Swani itself. Outside, on the northwest side of the structure, is a large water basin known as the Sahrij Swani.

=== House of the Ten Norias ===
The "House of the Ten Norias", also known as the Dar al-Ma ("House of Water"), stands on the northeast side of the Heri es-Swani silos. Visitors to the complex today enter through this building first. It is a massive structure consisting of a large central chamber surrounded by smaller rooms around which, in turn, was a large vaulted corridor which gave access to 15 domed chambers. These domed chambers each held a noria or mechanical hydraulic system which drew water from a deep well reaching down to the phreatic table, via a series of pails or buckets chained together and raised by a horse-drawn wheel. This structure in turn provided water for the royal city through a system of terracotta or clay channels.

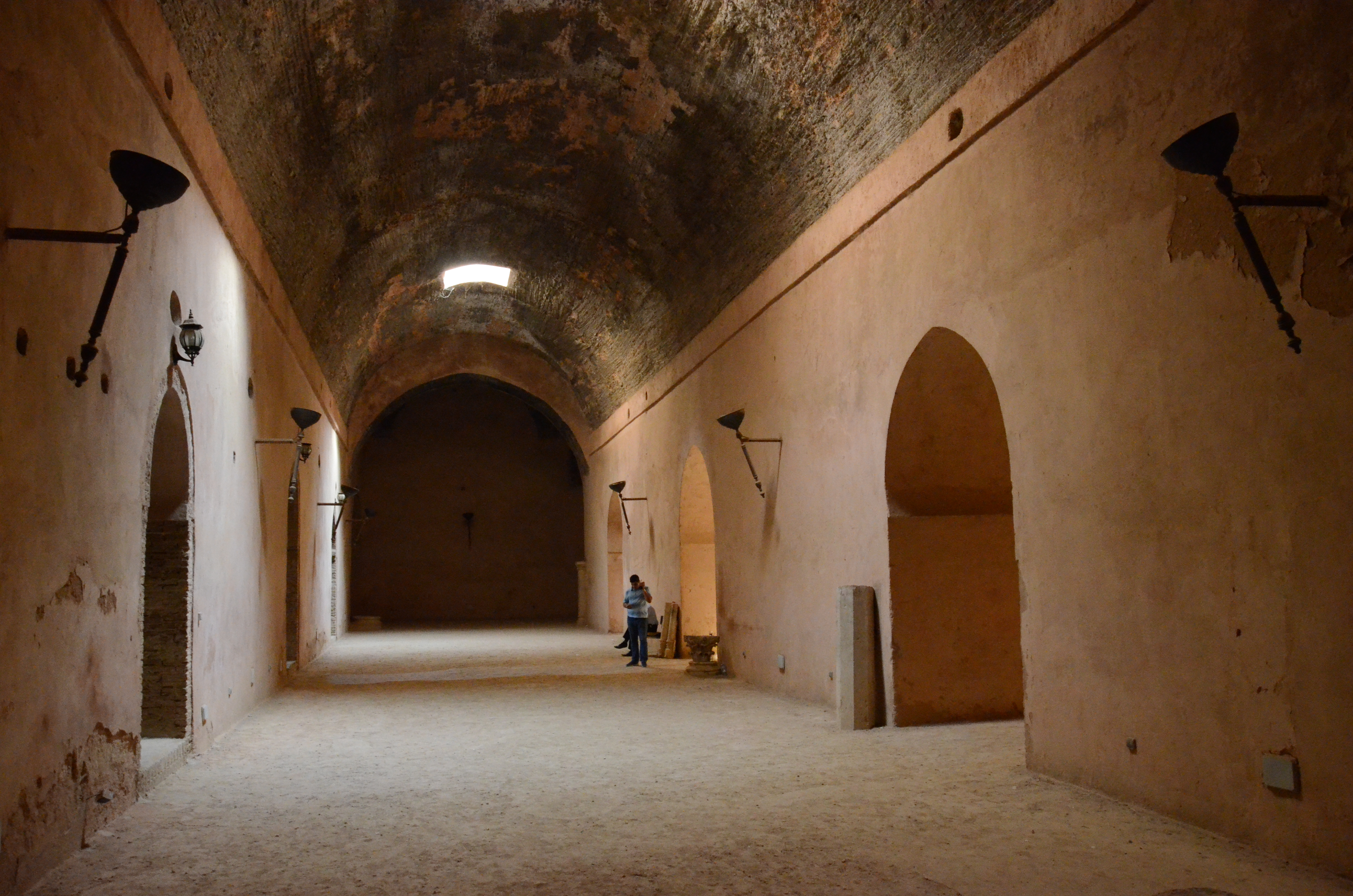
Vaulted passage in the House of the Ten Norias

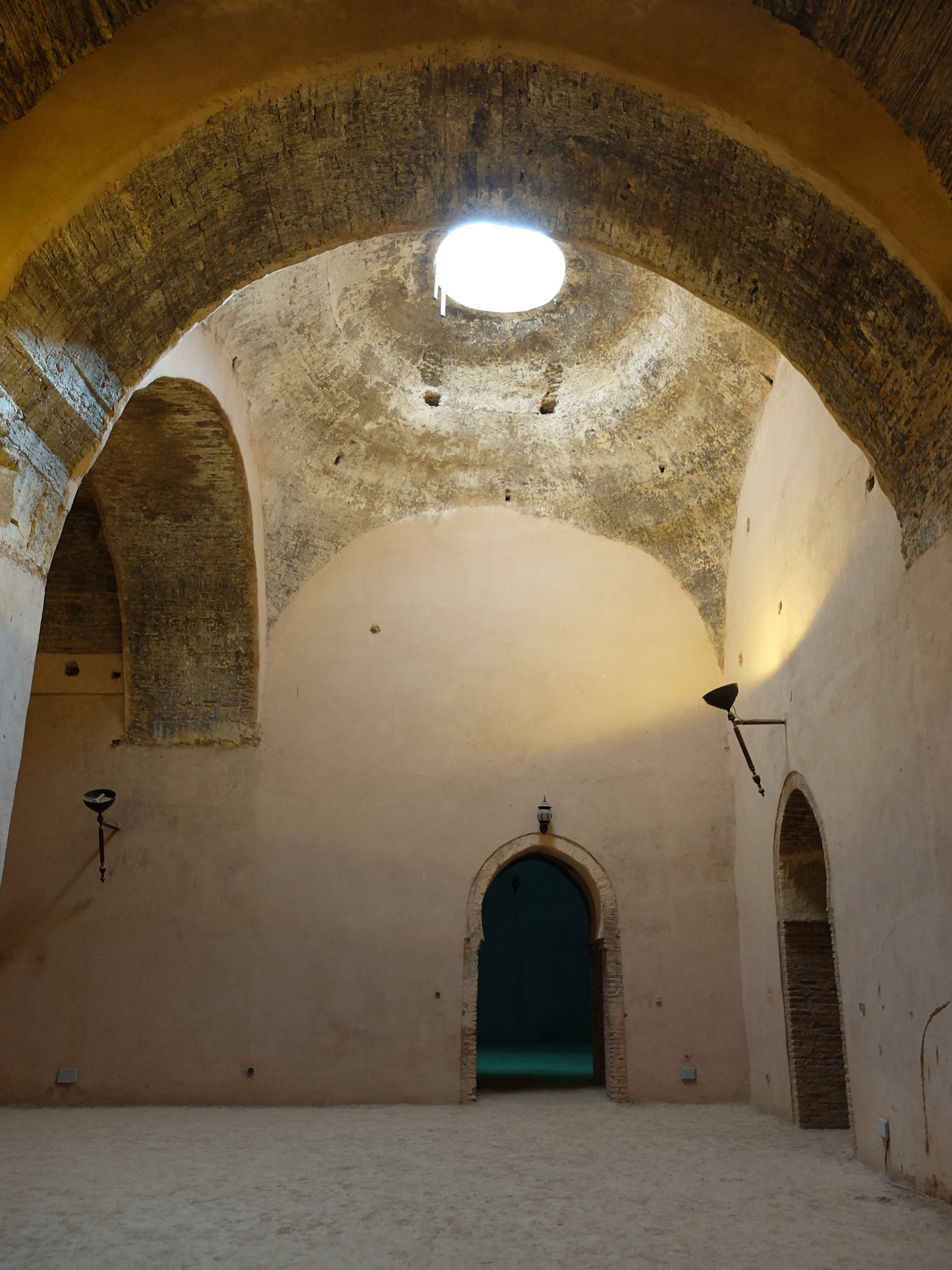
Domed corner in the vaulted passages of the House of the Ten Norias

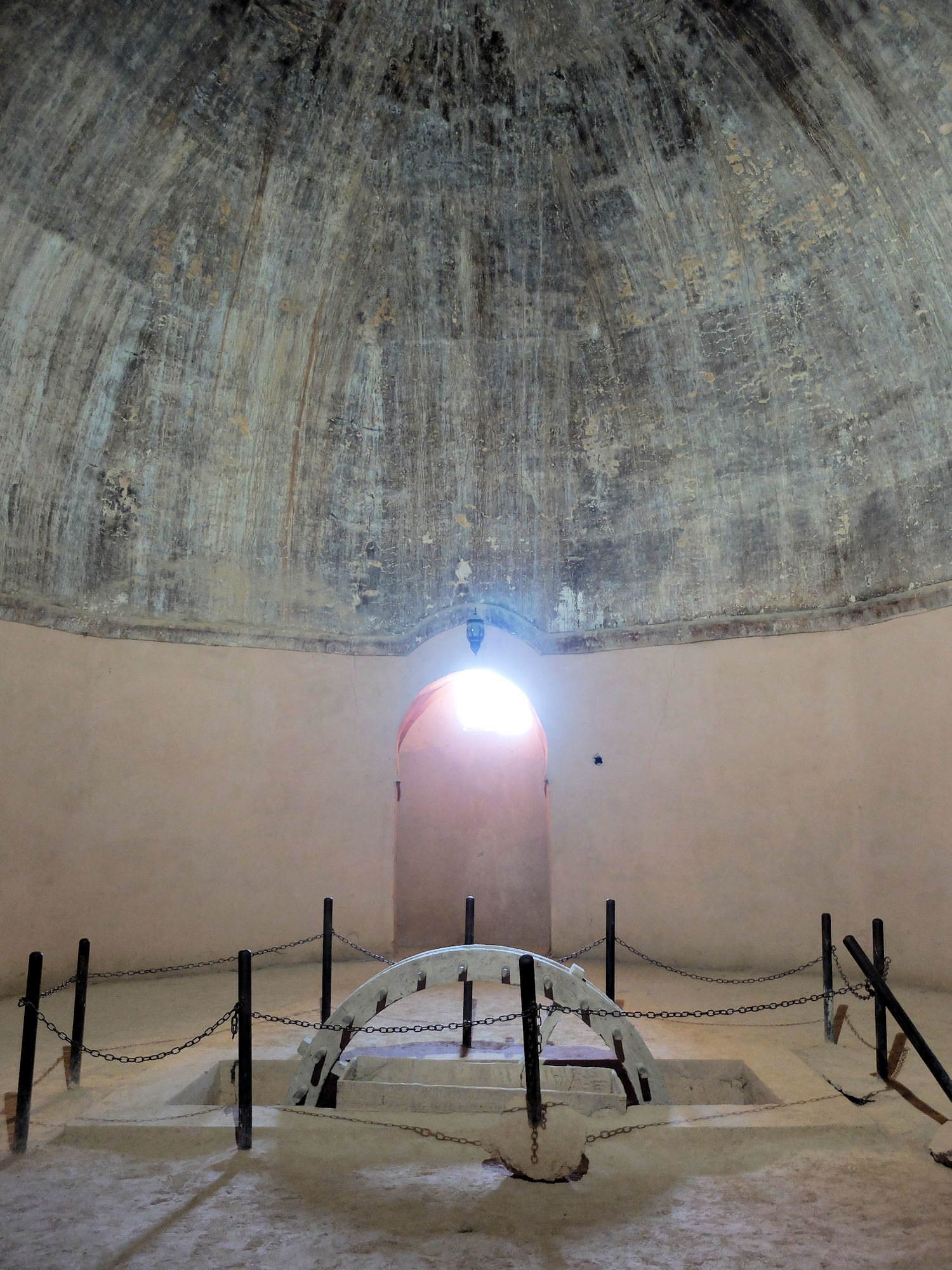
Domed chamber with noria

=== The grain silos ===
The Heri as-Swani itself is a vast area of silos which are adjoined to the southwest side of the House of the Ten Norias. This structure measures 182 by 104 meters and is divided by 22 rows of thick arches between which are corridors that were originally roofed by vaults. The building is often mistakenly referred to as the "stables" or "royal stables" of Moulay Isma'il, but it was in fact an enormous grain storage warehouse which could stockpile supplies to withstand a long siege. Grain was delivered to the building by mules who climbed onto a roof terrace and dropped the grain directly into holes that were pierced in the vaulted roofs. One interior corridor remained free of grain to allow for circulation inside the silos. Today, the vaulted roofs have collapsed and disappeared, leaving only the numerous rows of arches, which are considered one of the most impressive sights in the city.

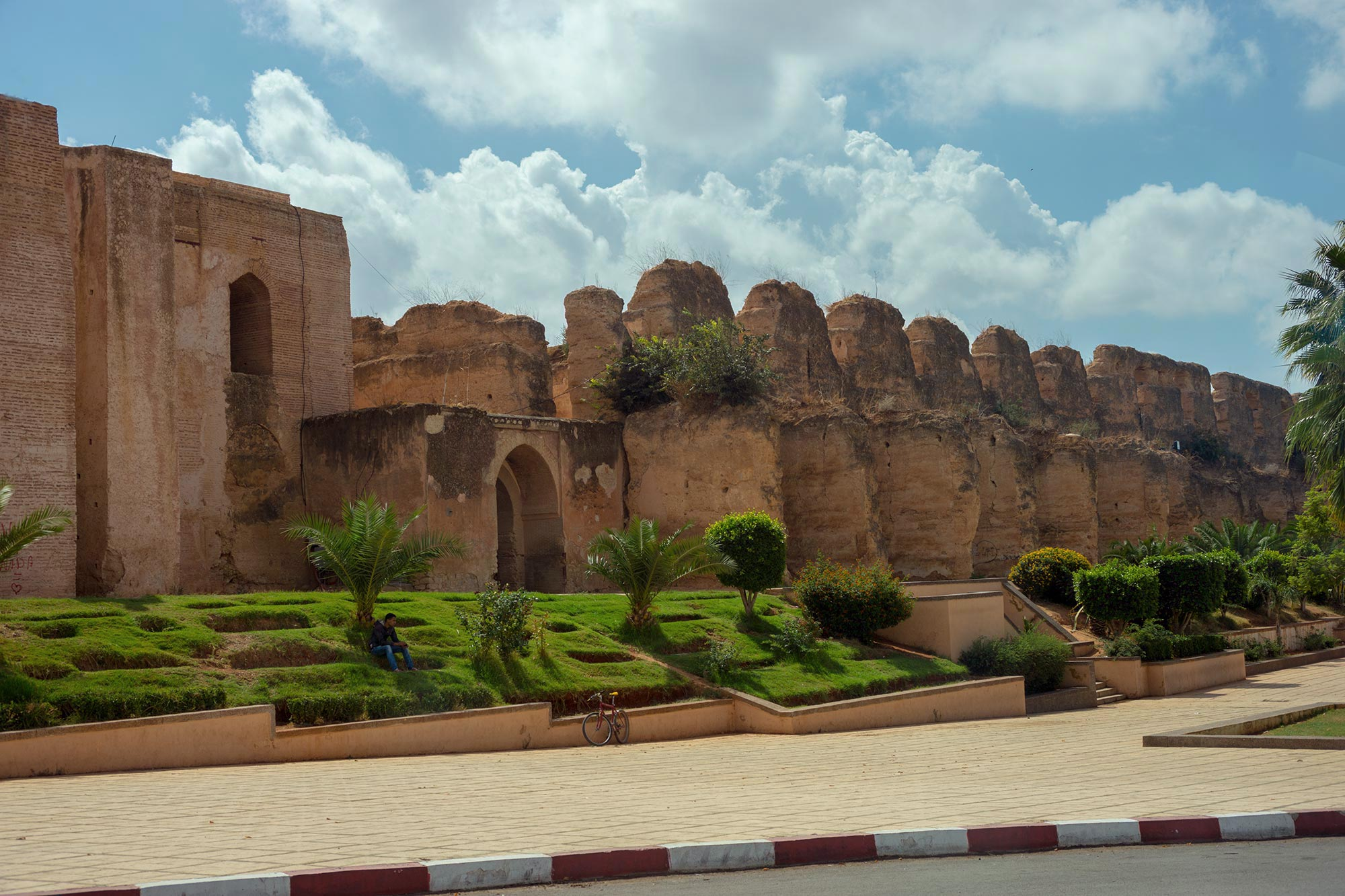
Outer walls of the granary

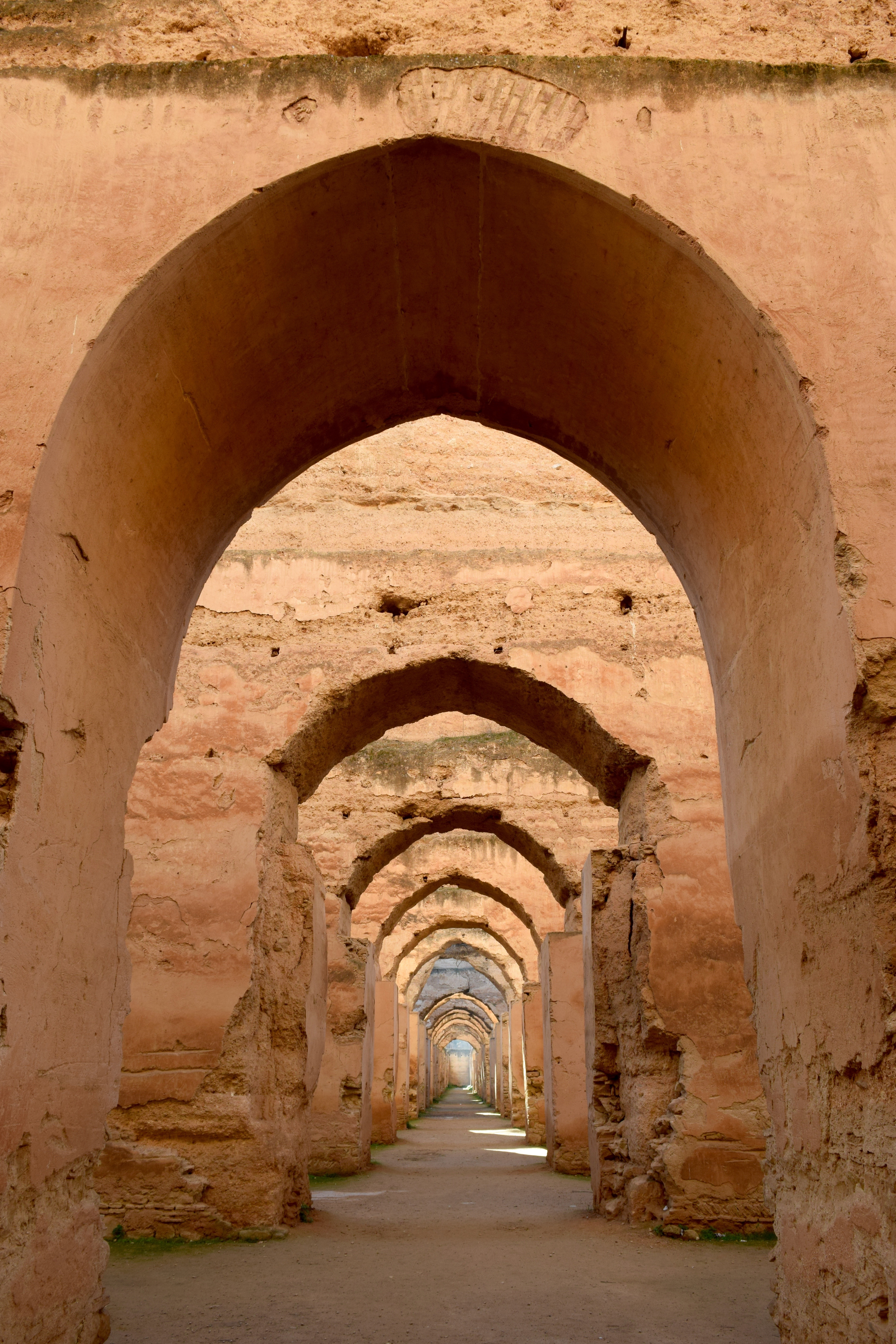
View of the rows of arches in the granary

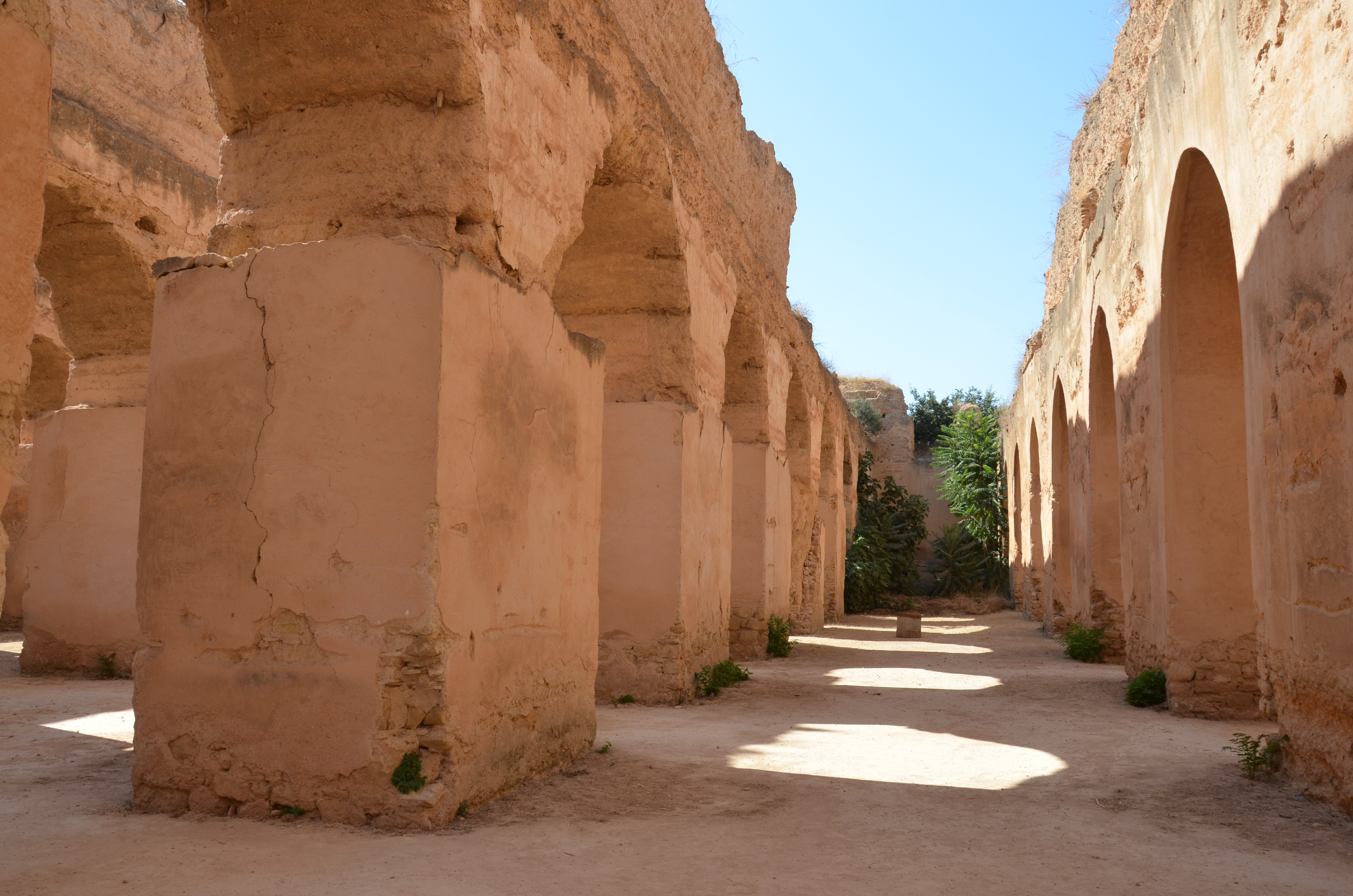
Formerly vaulted corridors between the arches of the granary

=== Sahrij Swani (water basin) ===
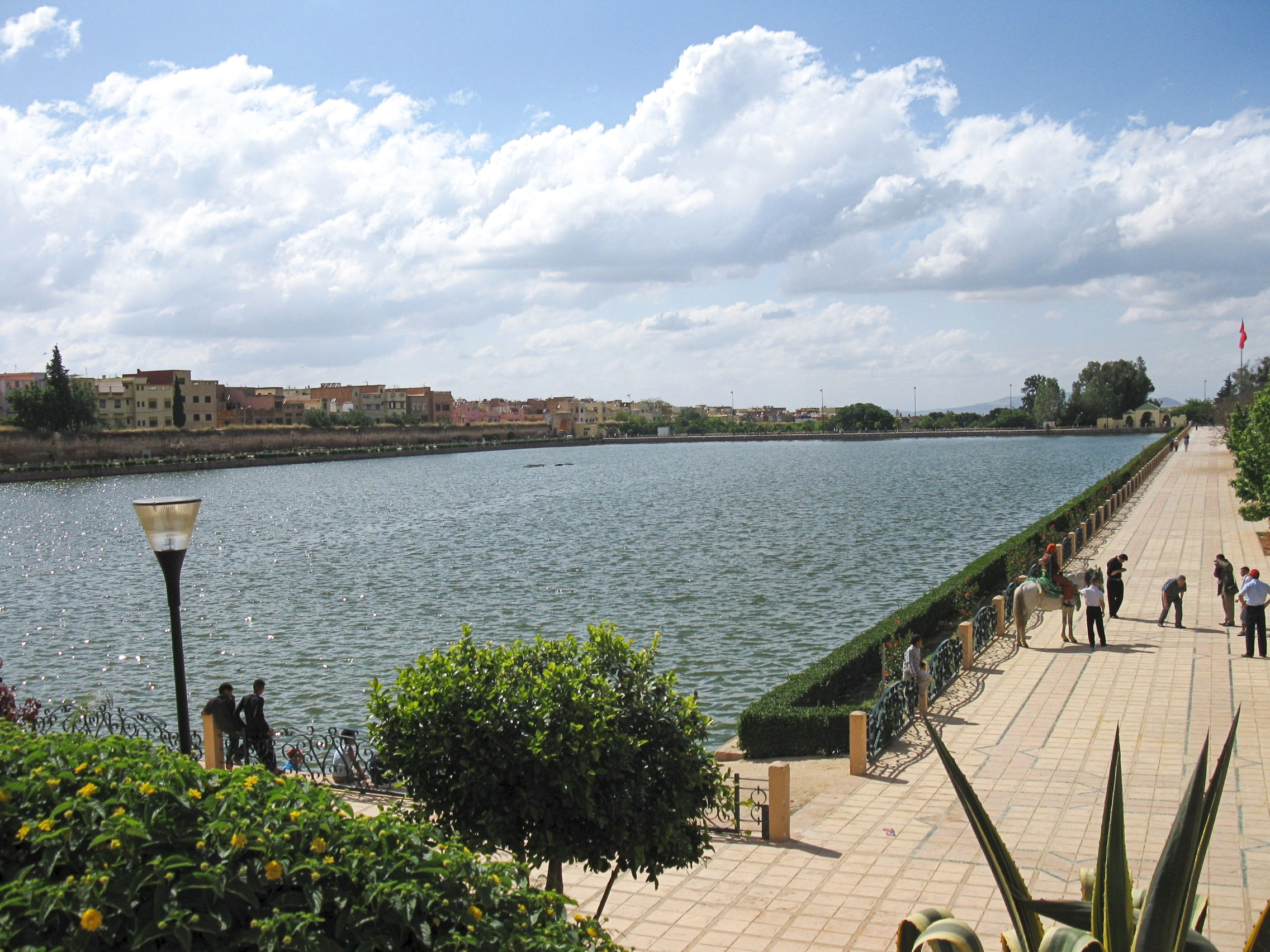
The Sahrij Swani or Agdal Basin, next to the Heri as-Swani

A third element of the complex is the vast water basin or artificial lake that stretches next to the main structure, the Sahrij Swani or Sahrij Souani ("Basin of the Norias"), also known as the Agdal Basin. The nearly rectangular basin measures 148.75 by 319 meters and is 1.2 meters deep on average. Although the basin was apparently also used for leisure by palace residents who bathed here or wandered around on small boats, its purpose appears to have been primarily utilitarian and integrated to the royal city's water supply. It was supplied with water by the adjacent House of the Ten Norias on its southeast side. In this regard it resembled the water basin in the Menara Gardens of Marrakesh. Possibly because of its importance, it was enclosed by its own two-meter-thick defensive wall, of which only a small section remains to the southwest (separating it from the Beni Mohammed neighbourhood beyond).
