= Bab el-Khemis (Meknes) =

- باب الخميس
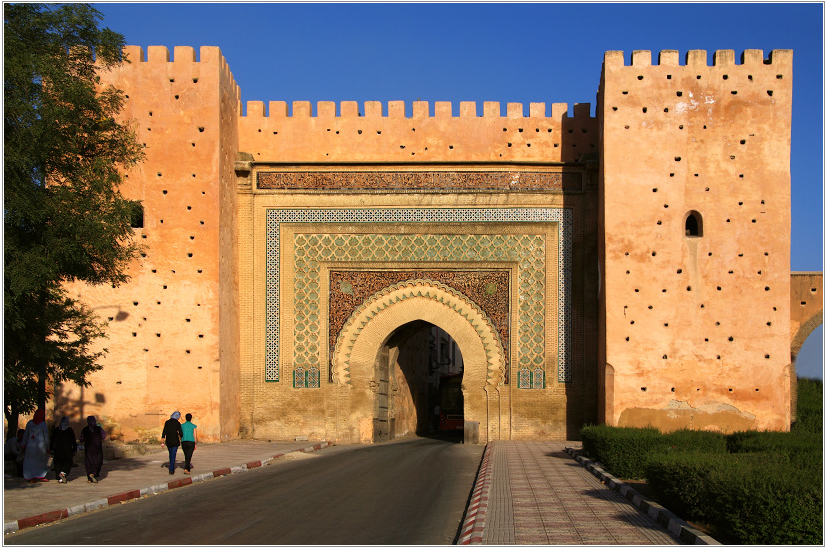
- Bab El Khemis
- Interactive map of the Bab el-Khemis area

General information
- Type: city gate
- Location: Meknes, Morocco
- Coordinates: 33°53′29.04709″N 5°34′20.66610″W
- Completed: circa 1668

Bab el-Khemis (Arabic: باب الخميس, romanized: Bāb al-Ḫamīs, lit. 'gate of Thursday') is a historical city gate in the west of the old town (medina) of Meknes, Morocco.

== Name ==
The name of the gate (or the Bab) is spelled in different ways such as El Khemiss or Lakhmis.

The literal meaning of the name is the Thursday door or gate in Arabic, in reference to the weekly market or souk, held on a Thursday, which is accessible using the gate. Such reference is commonly used to refer to city gates in other Moroccan towns such as Bab el-Khemis in Marrakesh.

== History ==
The city gate was completed in 1686 or 1687 during the reign of Alaouite Sultan Moulay Ismail who ruled between 1672 and 1727. It was once the main entrance to the Jewish quarter or Mellah and the western entrance to the City of the Garden of Amber, Madinat Ar-Riad Al Anbari, which housed the Oudaya's army and the members of the Ismail's court. The Mellah was razed in 1729 by Moulay Abdallah, the son of Moulay Ismail, allegedly in response to the mocking reception of its inhabitants upon his return from a lost battle against the rebels.

The geometry and decorations of the gate are similar to those of Bab el-Bardayin, which also dates from the reign of Moulay Ismail. The gate contains an inscription composed of three verses of poetry, as well as the word "constructed" which indicates the date of the completion of its construction: 1098 hijri year that corresponds to the year 1686–1687.

== See also ==
- Bab Mansur al-'Alj

== Bibliography ==
- Arnold Betten: Morocco. Antiquity, Berber Traditions and Islam - History, Art and Culture in the Maghreb. DuMont, Ostfildern 2012, pp. 64 and 166. ISBN 978-3-7701-3935-4
- Markus Hattstein, Peter Delius (Ed.): Islam. Art and architecture . Könemann Verlag, Cologne 2000, p. 305. ISBN 3-89508-846-3
