= 2004 Al Hoceima earthquake =

Earthquake near the northern Moroccan coast

2004 Al Hoceïma earthquake
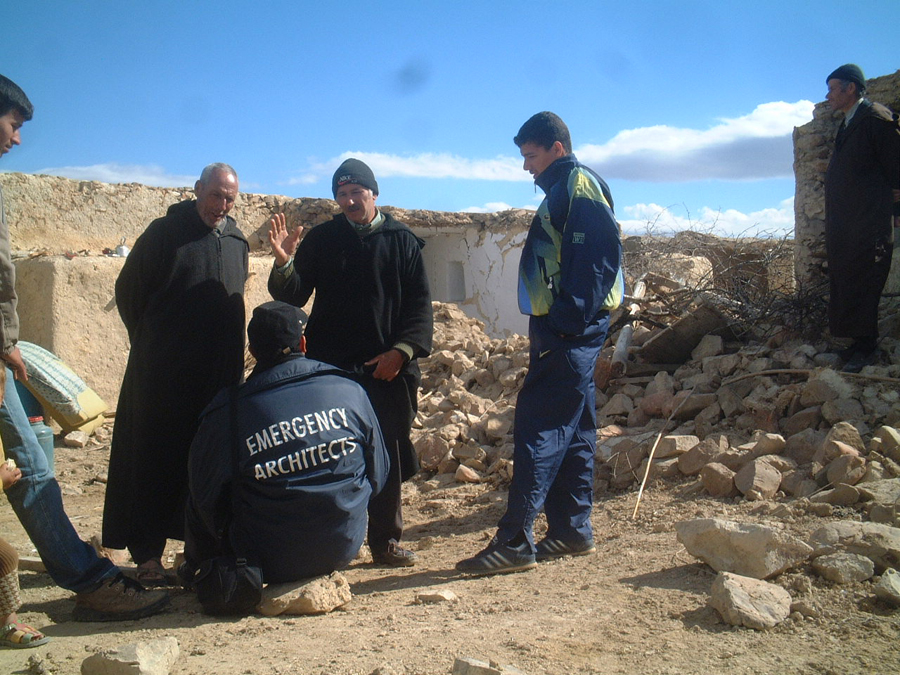

- UTC time: 2004-02-24 02:27:47
- ISC event: 7254476
- USGS-ANSS: ComCat
- Local date: 24 February 2004
- Local time: 03:27:47 CET (UTC+1)
- Magnitude: M_{w} 6.3–6.4
- Depth: 12.2 km (7.6 mi)
- Epicenter: 35.142°N 3.997°W
- Type: Strike-slip
- Areas affected: Al Hoceïma and Driouch Provinces, Morocco
- Max. intensity: MMI IX (Violent)
- Peak acceleration: 0.24 g
- Casualties: 631 fatalities, 926 injuries

On 24 February 2004 at 03:27 CET (02:27 UTC), an earthquake with a moment magnitude of 6.3 and maximum Mercalli intensity of IX (Violent) struck Morocco's Al Hoceïma Province. The earthquake's epicenter was located about 13 km (8.1 mi) south-southwest of the provincial capital of Al Hoceima. It killed 631 people, injured 926 others and destroyed over 2,500 homes, mostly in several villages within the Rif Mountains which were devastated.

== Tectonic setting ==
Northern Morocco lies close to the boundary between the African plate and the Eurasian plate, the Azores–Gibraltar transform fault. This zone of right-lateral strike-slip becomes transpressional at its eastern end, with the development of large thrust faults. To the east of the Strait of Gibraltar, in the Alboran Sea, the boundary becomes collisional in type. Most of the seismicity in Morocco is related to movement on that plate boundary, with the greatest seismic hazard in the north of the country, close to the boundary.

== Earthquake ==
M_{w}6.3–6.4 earthquake at 02:27 UTC

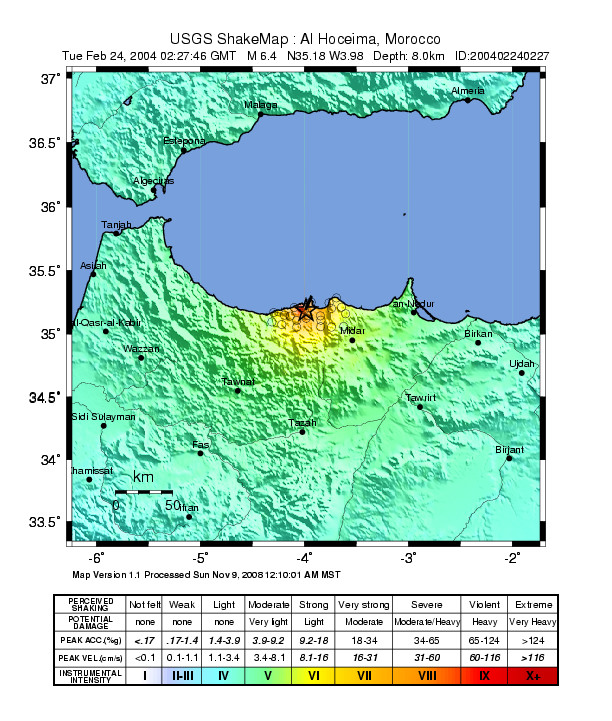
Strong ground motion map

Measuring M_{w} 6.3 or M_{wb} 6.4, the earthquake was caused by left-lateral strike-slip faulting on a buried northeast-southwest trending fault, as indicated by moment tensors and the pattern of surface cracks. The epicenter was less than a kilometer west of the village of Ait Kamara, located within the Rif mountains. With a shallow hypocenter 12.2 km (7.6 mi) beneath the surface, it had a maximum Modified Mercalli intensity of IX (Violent), which was assigned to Ait Kamara and the town of Imzouren; the latter town recorded a maximum peak ground acceleration of 0.24 g.

== Impact ==
At least 631 people were killed, 926 others were injured and 15,230 others were displaced. Deaths occurred in 12 municipalities within a 40 km (25 mi) radius of Al Hoceima town. At least 2,539 homes were destroyed, including 2,498 in rural areas. Out of the 2,779 buildings surveyed in the epicentral region, 1,046 were found to have collapsed or were left uninhabitable. Mohammed Boudra, the mayor of Al Hoceima town, said most of the casualties were women and children. Although only minor damage and one fatality occurred in the town, hospitals there received overwhelmingly high numbers of casualties from nearby areas. Further inland, many more residents of scattered villages within the Rif Mountains died. Adobe homes in the mountainous communities of Tazaghine, Tizi Ayash and Imzouren were damaged. Ait Kamara, the closest village to the epicenter, was completely destroyed, and 207 residents were killed. Five other villages were also heavily affected. In Imzouren, 73 people died and 110 homes collapsed. In the town, a M_{wc} 5.3 aftershock at 12:44 UTC on 25 February killed one person and destroyed two additional homes. In the village of Aït Abdelaziz, at least 50 people were killed and 70% of homes collapsed.

== Response ==
The Moroccan Protection Civile and the Royal Moroccan Army were the first to commence search and rescue operations in the area. Additionally, the Moroccan Red Crescent (MRC) worked closely with them in providing immediate relief assistance. According to media reports and the IFRC, the MRC mobilized over 200 staff and volunteers and dispatched relief items, including 2,000 blankets and 100 tents. Mohammed VI of Morocco, who visited the affected areas on 25 February, ordered all available resources to be mobilized to help with rescue efforts, including armed forces, military helicopters, police and firefighters. The Royal Moroccan Armed Forces joined the Royal Moroccan Gendarmerie and local rescue services in search and rescue operations. Helicopters were also used to bring large supplies of search and rescue equipment. Rescuers reported difficulties in reaching the affected areas, situated in the foothills of the Rif Mountains and served by narrow and poor roads. In the town, a M_{wc} 5.3 aftershock at 12:44 UTC on 25 February killed one person.

The International Federation of Red Cross and Red Crescent Societies (IFRC) launched an appeal for 2.8 million francs (US$2.3 million) to provide assistance to those left injured and homeless by the earthquake. The IFRC appeal was based on a preliminary assessment of the needs and aims to provide 1,500 tents, 30,000 blankets, 15,000 mattresses, 6,000 kitchen sets, heaters and food items to earthquake survivors. A seven-member Field Assessment and Co-ordination Team (FACT) from the IFRC provided support to the Moroccan Red Crescent and included specialists in emergency response, logistics and health. Emergency Response Units (ERUs) for health and water/sanitation were under consideration pending the assessment of the situation. The Melilla branch of the Spanish Red Cross also dispatched first aid kits. On 25 February, the United States provided 10,000 blankets, tents, water pumping and purification units, water containers, hygiene kits, generators, and other emergency items.

== See also ==
- 1960 Agadir earthquake
- 2003 Boumerdès earthquake
- 2023 Al Haouz earthquake
- List of earthquakes in 2004
- List of earthquakes in Morocco
