= Bab Berdieyinne Mosque =

Moroccan cultural heritage site

Bab al-Bard'iyin Mosque
- مسجد باب بردعين (Arabic) ⵎⴻⵣⴳⵉⴷⴰ ⵜⴰⵡⴰⵔⵟ ⵉⴱⴰⵔⴷⵉⵢⵏ (Berber)
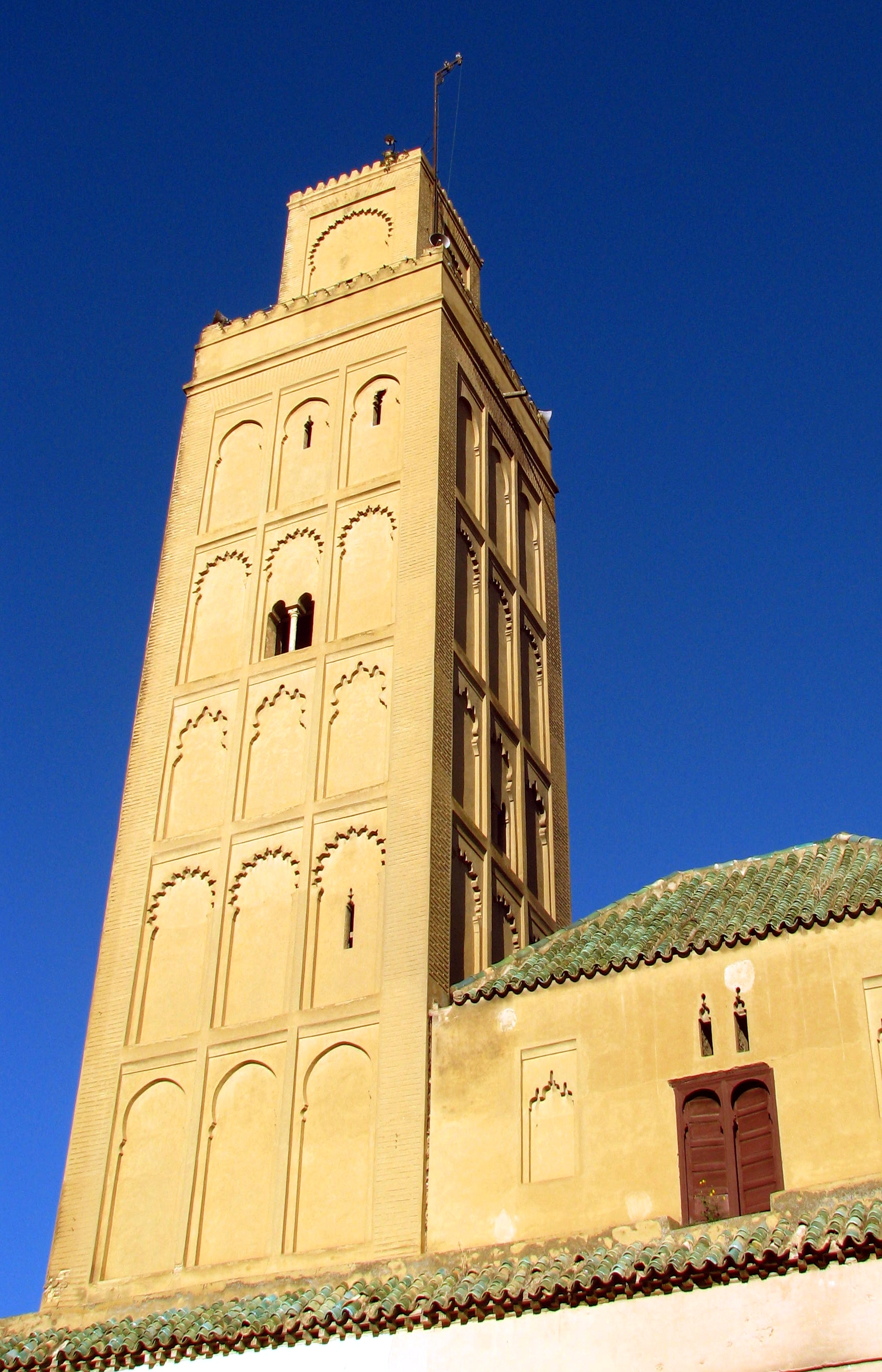
- The minaret of the Bab Berdieyinne Mosque, pictured in December 2009.

- Location of Meknes in Morocco.

Religion
- Affiliation: Islam
- Sect: Sunni (Maliki)
- Status: active

Location
- Location: Meknes, Morocco
- Coordinates: 33°53′59″N 5°34′3.35″W

Architecture
- Type: Mosque
- Style: Moroccan, Islamic
- Founder: Khnata bent Bakkar
- Completed: 1709 CE
- Minaret: 1

The Bab Berdieyinne Mosque (also spelled Bab Berdaine Mosque or Bab al-Bard'iyin Mosque) (Arabic: مسجد باب بردعين, romanized: Masjid Bab al-Bard'iyin; Berber: ⵎⴻⵣⴳⵉⴷⴰ ⵜⴰⵡⴰⵔⵟ ⵉⴱⴰⵔⴷⵉⵢⵏ) is a mosque in the old city (medina) of Meknes, Morocco, a UNESCO World Heritage Site. The mosque was built in the early 18th century on the orders of Morocco's first female minister, Khnata bent Bakkar, and was constructed of rammed earth. It is named after the nearby city gate.

On 19 February 2010, its minaret collapsed during Friday prayers, causing at least 41 fatalities and many injuries. The area had received heavy rain over the preceding days. The collapse of buildings in the older parts of Morocco's cities is fairly common but the collapse of minarets is rare. King Mohammed VI ordered the minaret be rebuilt according to historical specifications, and has ordered that all old mosques be appraised for structural stability. The reconstruction of the minaret is to be "to its original form". The collapse is the worst of its kind to have happened in Morocco. There was public criticism in Morocco for the apparent lack of maintenance at the mosque.

== Historical background ==
The mosque is named after the nearby northern gate of the city, Bab al-Bard'iyin, whose name probably derives from a historic market for vendors of packsaddles (al-Bard'iyin) which existed nearby. According to inscriptions inside the mosque, the construction of the mosque was supervised by a Berber chief named 'Ali ibn Yashu al-Yazghi and was completed in 1709 CE, under the reign of the Alawi sultan Moulay Isma'il. Moulay Isma'il made Meknes the capital of Morocco and built a vast citadel and palace complex next to the city, resulting in the construction and restoration of many mosques and other structures in the city in his time. The initiative to build the mosque is attributed to Khnata bent Bakkar, a wife of the sultan who was vizier (minister) under him and became de facto ruler of Morocco in 1728 after his death.

The mosque was renovated and restored under Sultan Moulay Muhammad ibn Abdallah (ruled 1757–1790) and during the French Protectorate under Moulay Yusuf (1912–1927).

== Architecture ==
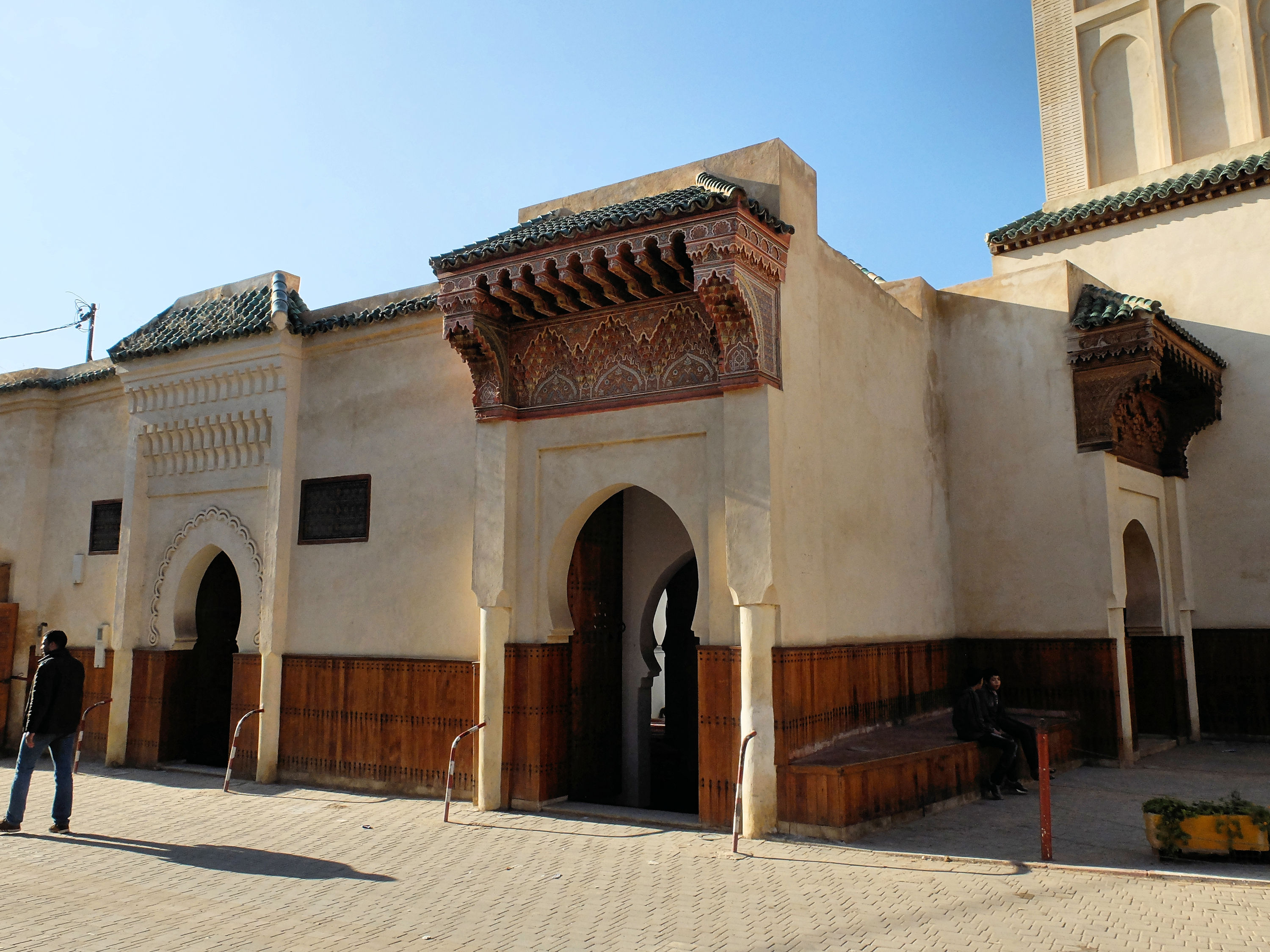
The entrances to the mosque

The mosque covers a surface area of 620 square metres. It is composed of a prayer hall divided into three transverse aisles running parallel to the qibla wall, as well as an inner courtyard (sahn). The minaret is made of brick and is the tallest minaret in the city dating from the reign of Moulay Isma'il. It has a square base and each of its four facades has a simple and near-identical decoration of blind arches.

== Collapse of the minaret in 2010 ==
On 19 February 2010 a minaret collapsed at the Bab Berdieyinne mosque. The collapse followed several days of heavy rain which has been blamed for weakening the minaret, which was made of rammed earth. Of the 300 worshipers inside 41 were killed and 75 were injured; others were buried beneath the rubble. Rescue attempts were hindered by narrow access routes to the mosque and the potential for other walls collapsing.

The collapse occurred at 12.45 GMT on 19 February 2010, following several days of heavy rain in the area, which the government has blamed for the collapse. The rains had already killed people through flooding and had destroyed roads and crops. More than 300 worshippers were in the mosque at the time for Friday prayers and the collapse came just as the imam was about to begin his sermon. Funeral prayers were due to have been said as part of the sermon and a body was present in the mosque. The last body was recovered from the mosque on 20 February, bringing the total killed to 41 with a further 75 injured. At one point up to 80 people were said to be buried under the rubble which rescuers removed using shovels and their bare hands. The lightly injured are being treated in hospital in Meknes, and the more seriously wounded have been sent to Fes. Of the 75 injured, 17 required long term hospitalisation.

=== Reaction ===
A search and rescue operation was implemented and the site has been visited by the country's interior and religious affairs ministers who also visited the injured in hospital. A team of psychologists was sent to the site. The rescue operation was slowed by narrow streets, which prevent the use of heavy machinery, and the fragile state of the walls of neighbouring shops and houses.

== See also ==
- List of mosques in Morocco
