= Bab Moulay Ismaïl =

Moroccan cultural heritage site

- باب مولاي إسماعيل
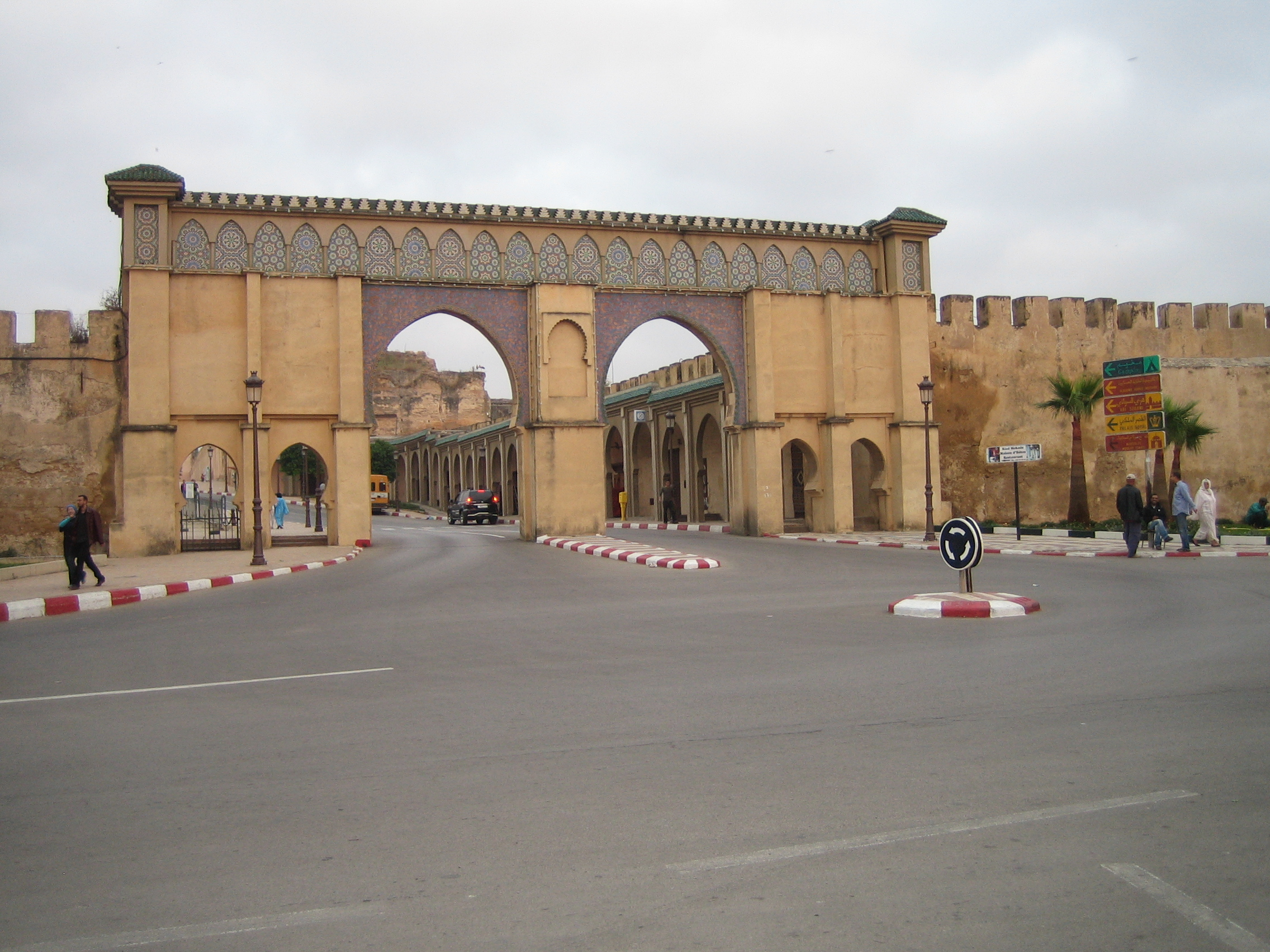
- Interactive map of the Bab Moulay Ismaïl area
- Alternative names: Bab Moulay Ismail

General information
- Type: City Gate
- Location: Meknes

References
- pc_architecture/sanae:390117

Bab Moulay Ismaïl (Arabic: باب مولاي إسماعيل) is one of the city gates of Meknes, Morocco. It dates back to the 17th century and was named after Moulay Ismail.

== See also ==
- Moroccan architecture
