= Bab al-Barda'in =

City gate in Meknes, Morocco

- باب بردعين
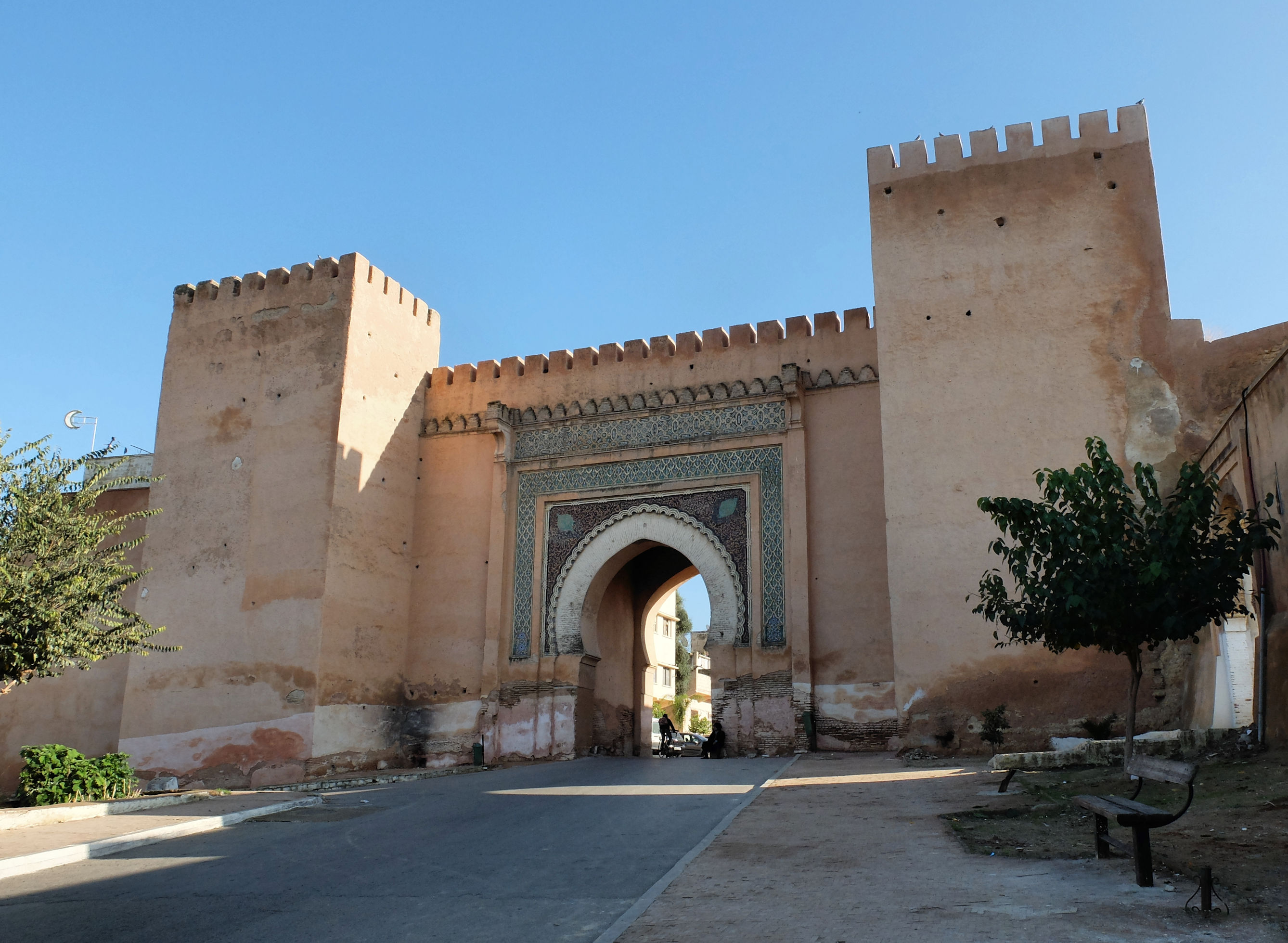
- Interactive map of the Bab al-Barda'in area

General information
- Type: City gate
- Location: Meknes, Morocco
- Coordinates: 33°54′4″N 5°34′5.9″W
- Completed: 1672 to 1727

Bab al-Barda'in or Bab Berdaïne (Arabic: باب بردعين) is the northern gate of the historic medina of Meknes, Morocco.

== History ==
Bab al-Barda'in existed as one of the original gates of the 11th-century city fortified by the Almoravids. This original medieval gate is partly preserved to the south of the present-day gate. The current gate at the northern end of the medina was built under the Alaouite sultan Moulay Isma'il (ruled 1672–1727). Isma'il made Meknes his capital and refortified the city while building a new imperial palace complex to the southeast. According to Ibn Zaydan the new gate was completed in 1695, though other sources cite 1687 1720 as the completion date. Around the same period, the nearby Bab al-Barda'in Mosque, named after the gate, was completed in 1709. Moulay Isma'il also built a public fountain near the gate. The gate historically had great importance for the city, being the entry point for all trade and communications with the north of the country. The name of the gate likely derives from a historic market for vendors of packsaddles (Arabic: بردعين, romanized: al-brad'iyin, but locally pronounced as berda'in) which existed nearby.

== Description ==
=== Architecture ===
The gate is one of the most impressive in the city. It bears strong architectural similarities to Bab el-Khemis to the southwest, which dates from the same era. The gate has a simple straight passage (as opposed to the bent entrances of medieval Moroccan gates) opening through a horseshoe archway and is flanked by two large square bastion towers. On the gate's inner (southeastern) side, the entrance passage projects outwards from the surrounding wall. Like Bab el-Khemis, the archway of the gate is set within a square space (measuring 11 metres (36 ft) per side) which is covered in decoration. The spandrels of the arch are filled with tiles painted with an arabesque floral motif and two mandorla-like shapes. Around this is a semi-rectangular frame or frieze filled with a darj-wa-ktaf pattern, with zellij tiling filling the space between the lines of the pattern. Above this runs a horizontal frieze filled with a geometric pattern which in turn is filled with more zellij. The decorated space is bordered on the left and right by two pilasters topped by consoles. Above all this in turn is a frieze of sawtooth-shaped merlons.

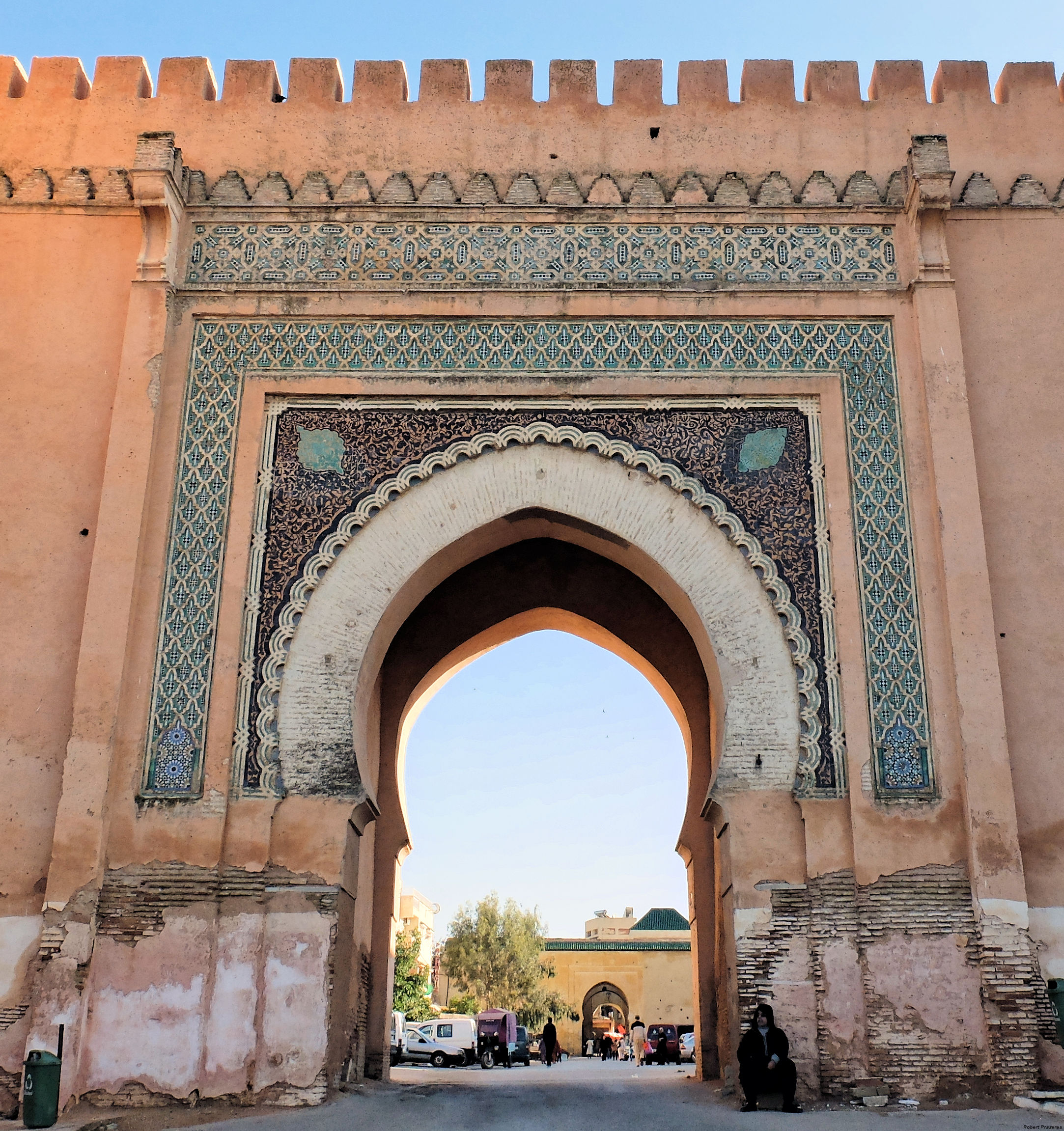
Decoration around the outer archway of the gate

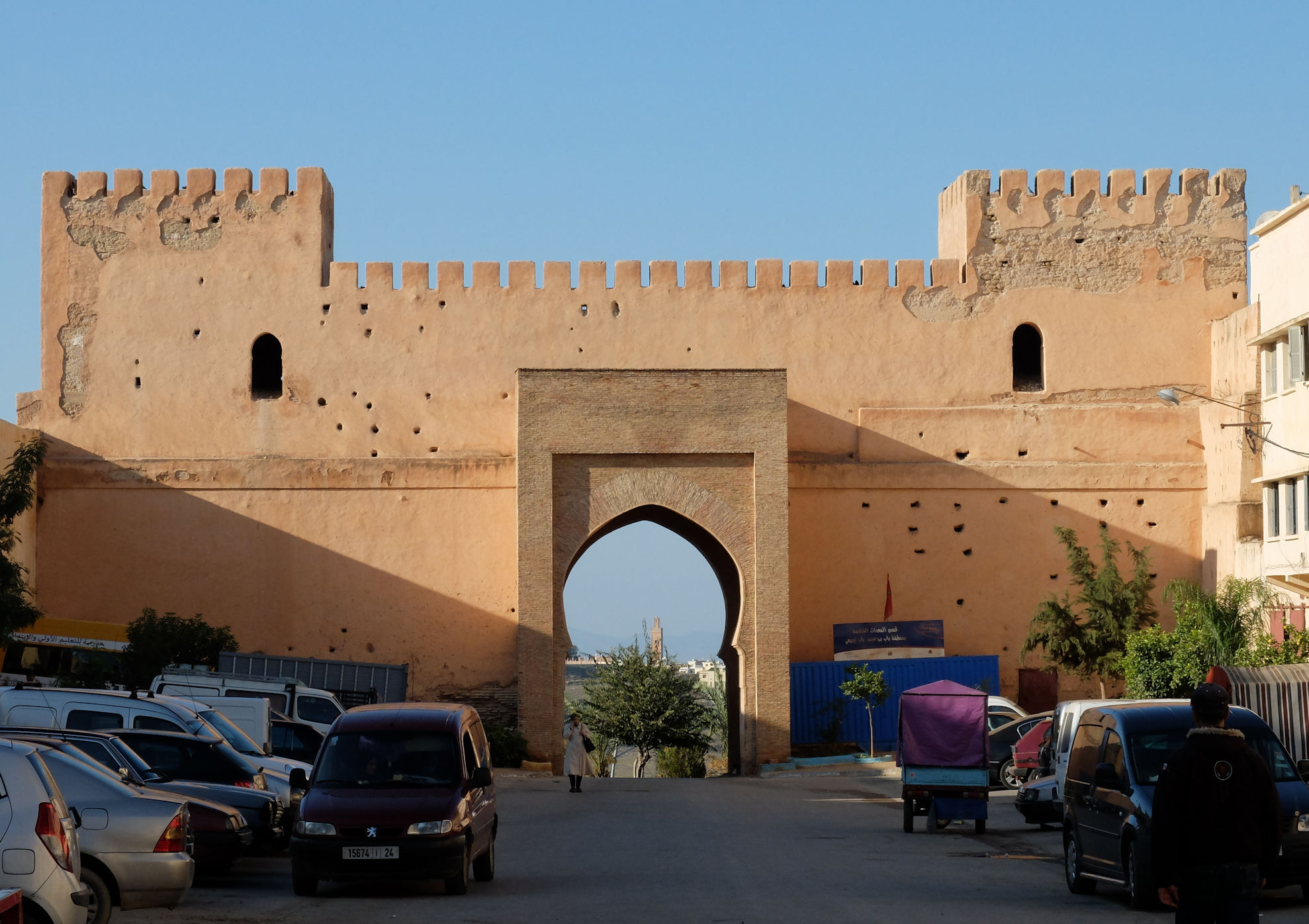
View of the inner side of the gate

=== Cemetery ===
A cemetery exists right outside the gate. According to Ibn Zaydan, a cemetery had existed here since the Almohad conquest of the city (12th century), dedicated to the martyrs who were killed in the siege. The vast cemetery present here today, also known as the Bab al-Siba Cemetery, still includes the Shuhada or Chouhada Cemetery (Martyrs' Cemetery), the Mausoleum of Moulay Abdallah Ben Ahmed (or Abdallah ibn Hamad: a celebrated faqih who died in 1429), the mausoleum and Zawiya of Sidi Mohammed Ben Aissa, as well as the tombs of numerous other Muslim saints.
