= 1755 Meknes earthquake =

Earthquake in Morocco

- Location within Morocco
- Local date: 27 November 1755
- Magnitude: 6.5–7.0 M_{w}
- Epicenter: 34.080°N 5.000°W
- Areas affected: Morocco
- Max. intensity: MMI X (Extreme)
- Casualties: 15,000 dead

The 1755 Meknes earthquake affected Morocco on 27 November 1755. The earthquake had a moment magnitude (M_{w}) estimated at between 6.5 and 7.0. It devastated the cities of Fes and Meknes—killing at least 15,000 people in both cities. The earthquake struck less than a month after another earthquake that devastated Morocco and Lisbon on 1 November. Previously regarded as an aftershock, this earthquake likely represented rupture of a separate fault due to changes in tectonic stress following their first event.

== Tectonic setting ==
The western Eurasian–Africa plate boundary is dominated by the Gloria Fault System which lies between the Azores triple junction and Gibraltar Arc. The plate boundary around the Gibraltar Arc and Alboran Sea area is less defined and characterized by a broad zone of seismicity. The African and Eurasian plates converge in a N–S to NNW–SSE direction. The convergence is related to uplift and thrust tectonics along the Rif mountains.

== Earthquake ==
The shock came just days after another earthquake affected Lisbon (1 November)—it was mistakenly identified as an aftershock of that event, and misdated to 18 November. Arab sources attribute the earthquake to 27 November and mezoseismal area to Fes and Meknes. A seismic rupture was also reported but poorly documented.

During a field survey of the area in 2017, surface ruptures were identified along the 150 km (93 mi)-long Southern Rif front; a thrust fault with some left-lateral strike-slip component. The fault displays a listric geometry and is connected with a décollement at its base; dipping at 60° near the surface to 35° at depth. A slip rate was estimated at 3.5 ± 1 mm (0.138 ± 0.039 in)/yr for the Holocene. The fault accommodates convergence between the African plate and the Rif. The last earthquake along the fault produced 0.9–1.7 m (2 ft 11 in – 5 ft 7 in) of coseismic slip—by assuming that as the average slip across a 30 km (19 mi) surface rupture, the moment magnitude obtained was 6.5–7.0. Although not considered an aftershock of the 1 November Lisbon earthquake, it may have been an example of a triggered earthquake due to stress transfer.

== Damage ==
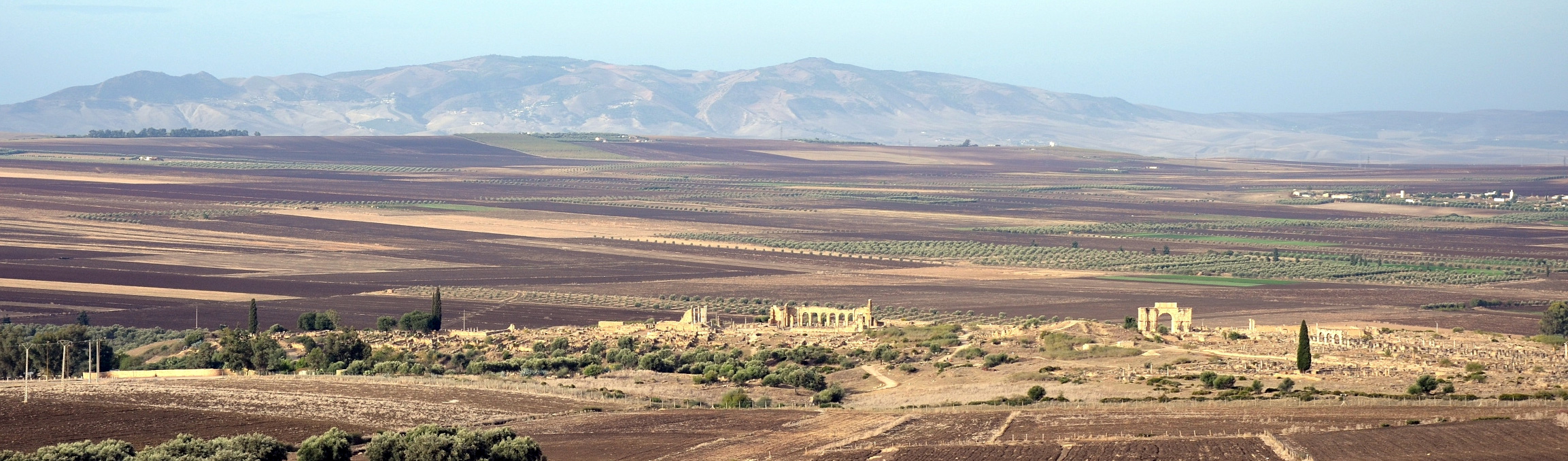
Panorama of Volubilis

The earthquake caused great devastation in Fes and Meknes; thousands were killed. It was followed by strong aftershocks that continued for months. At Meknes, only a few homes remained standing but were badly damaged. Of the 16,000 Jews in the city, only 8,000 survived—an additional 4,000 Muslims perished. The earthquake also destroyed the Christian church and the Franciscan convent and hospital. In Fez, 3,000 people died. Significant damage occurred at the Roman archeological site Volubilis, and several kilometers to its south, a major landslide affected Moulay Idriss Zerhoun. The documentation of surface rupture led geologists to conclude that it was a local earthquake. Surface ruptures associated with an east–west fault at Jebel Zerhoun and Jebel Zalagh, north of Fes and Meknes were studied.

== See also ==
- List of historical earthquakes
- List of earthquakes in Morocco
