= Gibraltar Arc =

Geologic region of Iberia and north Africa

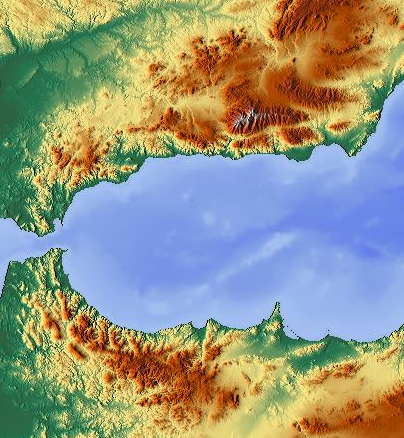
Gibraltar Arc

The Gibraltar Arc is a geological region corresponding to an arcuate orogen surrounding the Alboran Sea, between the Iberian Peninsula and Africa. It consists of the Betic Cordillera (south Spain), and the Rif (North Morocco). The Gibraltar Arc is located at the western end of the Mediterranean Alpine belt and formed during the Neogene due to convergence of the Eurasian and African plates.

Maximum altitudes of the region are reached at the 3,482 m (11,424 ft) Mulhacén peak at the Cordillera Betica. Precipitation is collected mainly by the Guadalquivir (Betics) and Sebou (Rif) rivers, which have delivered most sedimentary infill of the homonymous sedimentary foreland basins.

== Tectonic evolution ==
North–south convergence of the Eurasian and African plates occurred during the middle Oligocene to the late Miocene, followed by northwest–southeast convergence from the late Tortonian to present. The Gibraltar Arc was formed during the Neogene due to a combination of western migration of the orogenic mountain front and late orogenic extension. The present convergence rate of the plates is estimated to be approximately 4.5 to 5.0 mm/year with an azimuth of 135–120°.

The eastward Gibraltar Arc oceanic subduction system was active during the Early and Middle Miocene and has likely been inactive since. At this time, the Alboran Sea acted as a back-arc basin during the deposition of accretionary units. Since the Late Miocene, north–south to northwest–southeast continental convergence forced the subduction system along the arc that is oriented N20°E to N100°E. There is a lithospheric slab dipping east from the Strait of Gibraltar down to 600 km depth beneath the Alboran Sea.

The crustal structure of the Gibraltar Arc is characterized by an arcuate bulge parallel to the arc, with crustal thinning occurring uniformly from the margins of the mountain ranges towards the Alboran Sea. The lithospheric mantle also has an arcuate bulge below the arc with extreme mantle thinning in the Alboran Sea, which is the typical structure of a back-arc basin located on the concave side of an arcuate mountain belt.

A major left-lateral strike-slip fault zone, the Trans-Alboran Shear Zone, crosscuts the Gibraltar Arc with a NE trend from the eastern Betics to the western Rif. It was active during the Neogene, contributing to the westward advance of the Gibraltar Arc. Some of the previous fault segments are active, with left-lateral transpressional faulting and moderate to significant clockwise stress rotations. Oblique to this shear zone, there are two major right-lateral strike-slip fault systems, the Maro-Nerja and Yusuf systems. These trend NW and have transtensional deformation. The present-day stress pattern is probably the consequence of the interference between two stress sources: ongoing continent convergence and secondary stress sources from variations in crustal thickness, sedimentary accumulations causing loading, and the active strike-slip fault.

== Geology ==
The Arc has two sections: the Internal and External Zones. The Internal Zone, which is located on the inner side of the arc, adjacent to the Alboran Sea, mostly consists of high-pressure, low-temperature metamorphic rocks. The External Zone, located on the outer side of the arc, is mostly made of sediments deposited on the passive margins of Africa and Iberia. These rocks became highly deformed during the westward emplacement of the hinterland of the subduction system, with some units in the External Rif having undergone medium-pressure, low-temperature metamorphism during the Oligocene. Flysch units from the Cretaceous to Early Miocene are located between the External and Internal Zones. These were folded and thrust during the westward migration of the Internal Zones and can be interpreted as the palaeo-accretionary wedge of the subduction system that was active during the Lower and Middle Miocene.

== See also ==
- Messinian salinity crisis
