= Alboran Sea =

Westernmost portion of the Mediterranean Sea

- Mar de Alborán
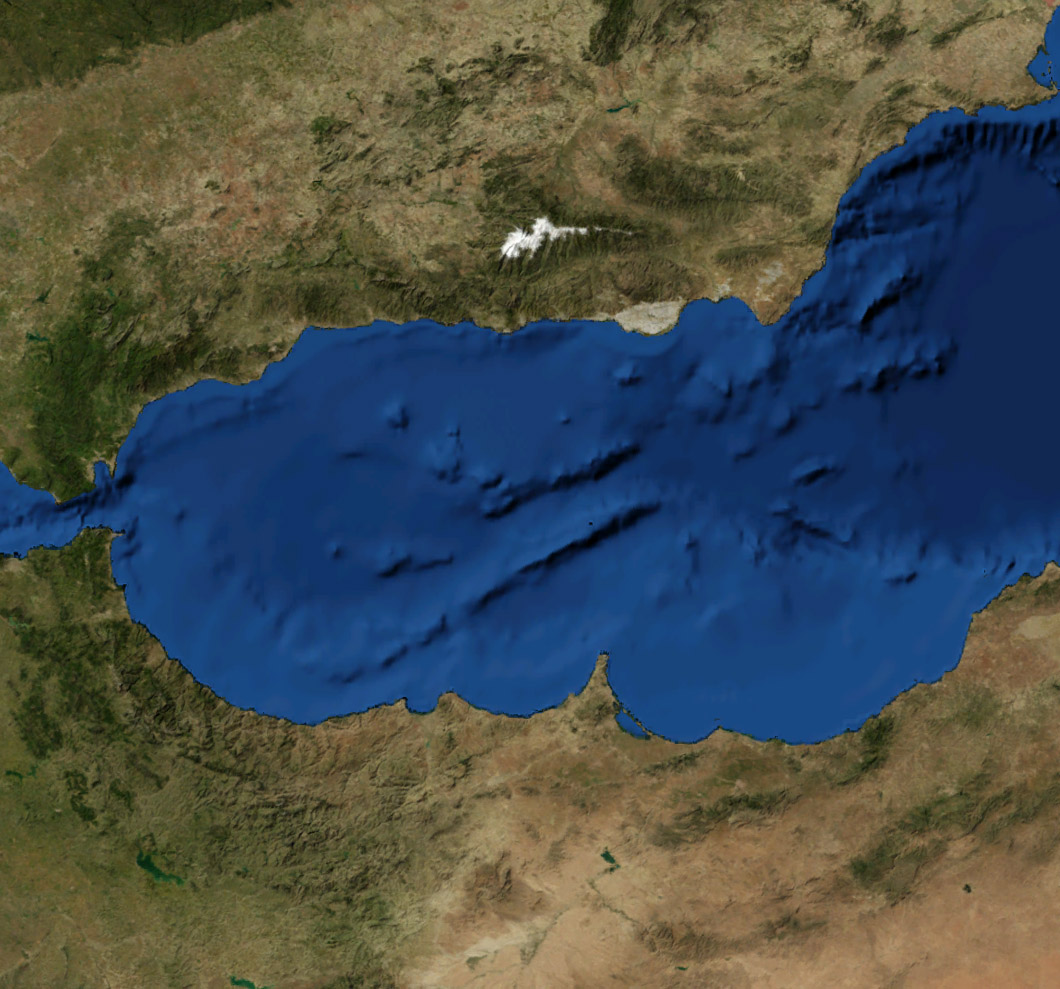

- Location within Mediterranean Location within Morocco Location within Spain Location within Algeria
- Location: Southern Europe and North Africa
- Coordinates: 36°0′N 3°0′W
- River sources: Guadalhorce River, Guadalfeo River, Adra River (Spain) and Nekor River (Morocco)
- Ocean/sea sources: Atlantic Ocean
- Basin countries: Algeria, Gibraltar (UK), Morocco, and Spain
- Average depth: 445 metres (1,460 ft)
- Max. depth: 1,500 metres (4,900 ft)
- Settlements: Málaga, Marbella, Motril, Almería and Cartagena, Spain; Al Hoceima and Nador, Morocco, Gibraltar

The Alboran Sea is the westernmost portion of the Mediterranean Sea, lying between the Iberian Peninsula and the north of Africa (Spain on the north and Morocco and Algeria on the south). The Strait of Gibraltar, which lies at the west end of the Alboran Sea, connects the Mediterranean with the Atlantic Ocean.

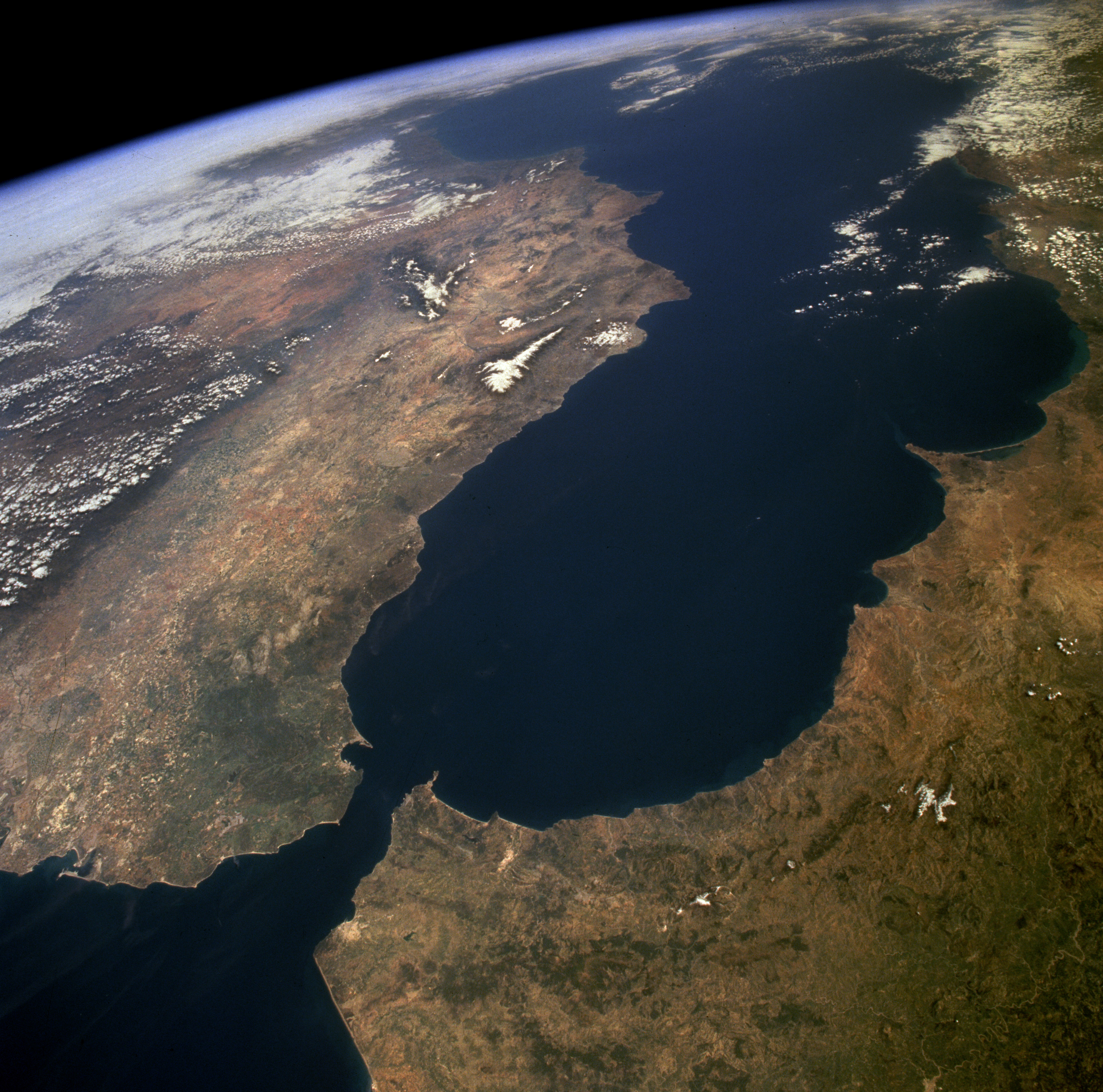
A satellite image centred on the Alboran Sea. To the left, the Iberian Peninsula, and to the right, the north of Africa.

== Geography ==
Its average depth is 445 metres (1,460 ft) and maximum depth is 1,500 metres (4,900 ft).

The International Hydrographic Organization defines the limits of the Alboran Sea as follows:

On the West. The Eastern limit of the Strait of Gibraltar: A line joining from tip (Europa Point) of Cap Gibraltar in Europe (36°6.5′N 5°20.7′W) to the tip of the Península de Almina of Ceuta in Africa (35°54′N 5°18′W).

On the East. A line joining from Cabo de Gata in Andalusia in Europe (36°43.3′N 2°11.6′W) to Cap Fegalo, near Oran, Algeria in Africa (35°36′N 1°12′W).

Several small islands dot the sea, including the eponymous Isla de Alborán. Most, even those close to the African shore, belong to Spain.

== Geology ==
The Alboran domain, the seafloor beneath the Alboran Sea (known as the internal zones) together with the surrounding mountains (known as the external zones; the Gibraltar Arc and Atlas Mountains), is mostly made of continental crust and marks the westernmost terminus of the terranes that were subducted between the African and Eurasian Plates when the Tethys Ocean closed. Recurring earthquakes at a depth of about 600 km (370 mi) indicate that this subduction is ongoing and that complex interactions between the lithosphere and mantle are forming the region. The internal zones are made of Late Paleozoic to Triassic rocks that were piled up during the Tertiary and has been extended since the Early Miocene.

The seafloor is morphologically complex with several sub-basins, including three main sub-basins named West, East, and South Alboran Basins, ridges, and seamounts. The most prominent structure in the Alboran Sea is the 180 km long (110 mi) Alboran Ridge which stretches southwest from the volcanic Alborán Island.

== Oceanography ==
Surface currents in the Alboran Sea, influenced by the prevailing winds, flow eastward, bringing water from the Atlantic into the Mediterranean; deeper subsurface currents flow westward, carrying saltier Mediterranean water over the Gibraltar sill into the Atlantic. Thus there is typically a vertical rotary circulation, also known as a gyre, in the Alboran Sea as a result of this exchange of water.

== Ecology ==
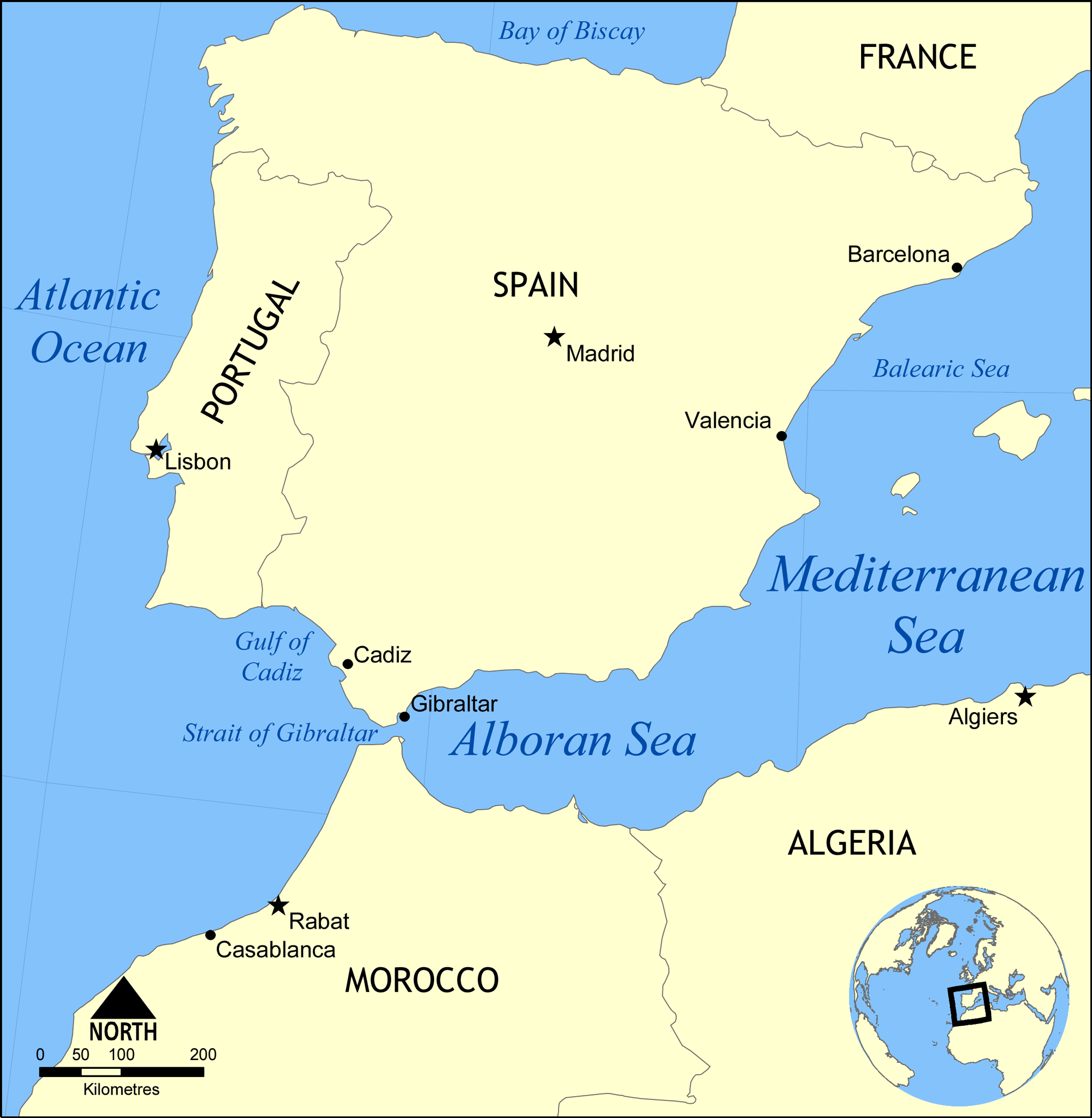
Map of the Alboran Sea

The Alboran Sea is a transition zone between ocean and sea, containing a mix of Mediterranean and Atlantic species. The Alboran Sea is habitat for the largest population of bottlenose dolphins and the last population of harbour porpoises in the western Mediterranean, and is the most important feeding grounds for loggerhead sea turtles in Europe.

The Alboran Sea also hosts important commercial fisheries, including sardines and swordfish. In 2003, the World Wildlife Fund raised concerns about the widespread drift net fishing endangering populations of dolphins, turtles, as well as other marine animals. In 2023, the European Union, Morocco, and Algeria agreed to ban bottom fishing practices around Cabliers Bank, protecting the only cold-water coral reef known to be growing in the Mediterranean.

An arc of mountains, known as the Gibraltar Arc, wraps around the northern, western and southern sides of the Alboran Sea. The Gibraltar Arc is made up of the Baetic Cordillera of Southern Spain and the Rif Mountains of Morocco. These mountains, known to ecologists as the Baetic-Rifan complex, comprise one of the Mediterranean's biodiversity hotspots; like the Alboran Sea, the Baetic-Rifan complex represents a transition between the Mediterranean and Atlantic (Macaronesian) ecological zones. The moderating influence of the Atlantic has allowed many relict species in the Baetic and Rif mountains to survive the climatic fluctuations of the last few million years that have caused them to become extinct elsewhere around the Mediterranean basin.

== Islands ==
There are some small islands in the sea:

- Isla de Alborán
- Islas Chafarinas
- Peñón de Alhucemas
- Peñón de Vélez de la Gomera
