= National School of Agriculture of Meknes =

- École Nationale d'Agriculture de Meknès
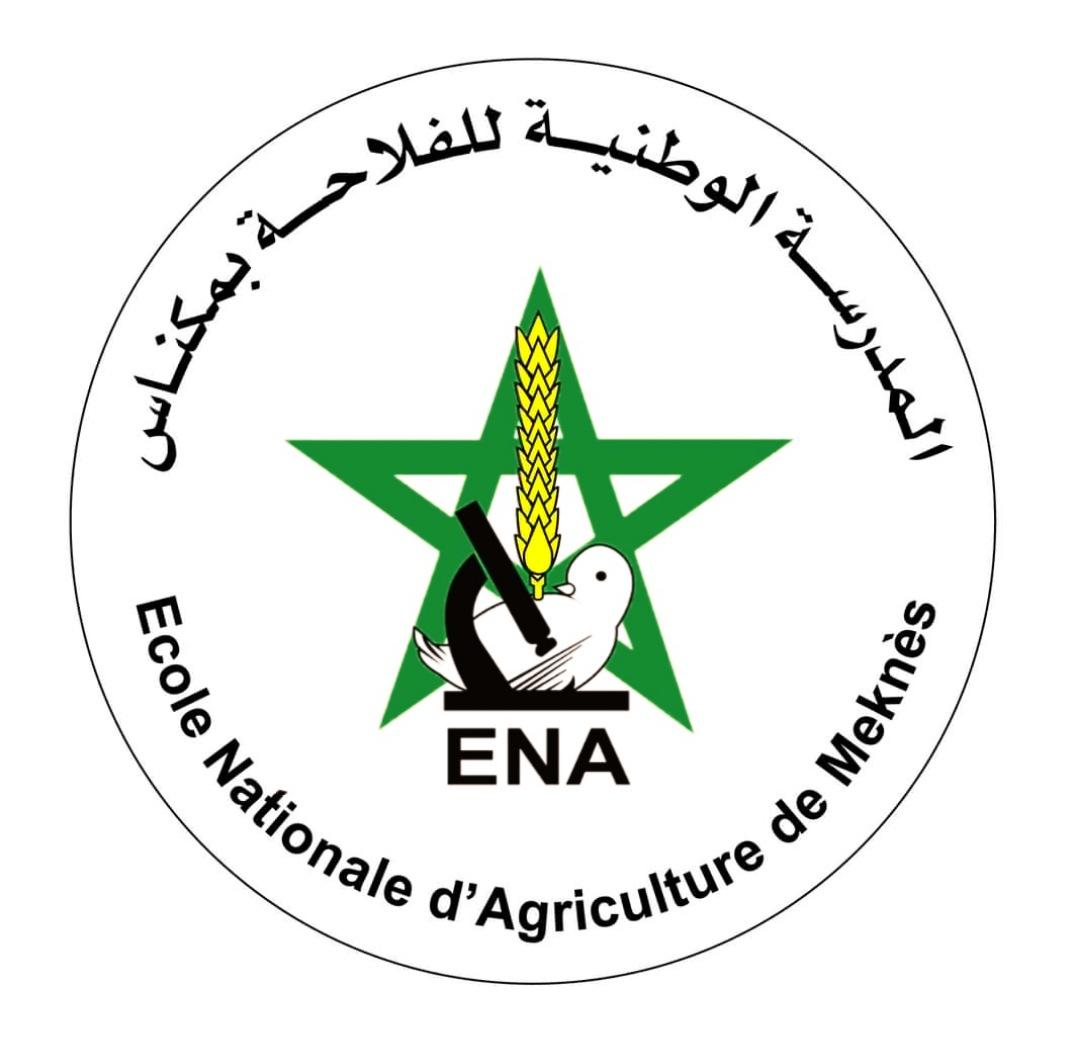
- Type: Grande école School of Agronomy Engineering
- Established: 1942
- Faculty: 56
- Location: Meknes, Morocco; 33.843527°N 5.477459°W
- Language: French
- Website: Official website

The National School of Agriculture of Meknes (ENA Meknes or ENAM) is a Moroccan public institution. It provides programs in higher agronomic education, rural development, and scientific research located in Meknes. ENA was established in 1942, during the French protectorate of Morocco, initially named the Moroccan School of Agriculture, offering a two-year program at the beginning, training agricultural technicians.

== Overview ==
Located 10 kilometres (6.2 mi) southeast of Meknes, the National School of Agriculture is a public institution with financial and moral autonomy under the supervision of the Ministry of Agriculture and Maritime Fisheries. ENA holds the distinction of being Morocco's first agricultural higher education institution. It has trained hundreds of agricultural professionals who have contributed significantly to Morocco's agricultural development and beyond. Today, ENA is an institution with international dimensions; besides training agronomy engineers, it conducts research across various agricultural and rural development domains. Its location in one of the country's main agricultural regions provides extensive exposure to diverse agricultural practices, offering ample opportunities for training and research.

== Academic programs ==
In its 72 years of existence, ENA has implemented four engineering training programs, each tailored to specific needs expressed by the governmental authority responsible for agriculture. By the end of 2009, ENA had graduated 2,733 engineers, including 393 international students. Since the enactment of Law No. 01-00 on higher education organization, promulgated by Dahir No. 1.00.199 on Safar 15, 1421 (19 May 2000), ENA has undergone reforms in its training and organizational systems.

The engineering curriculum spans five years post-baccalaureate, structured as follows:

- Preparatory Cycle: 2 years
- Engineering Cycle: 3 years

The first two years aim to strengthen students' fundamental knowledge in basic sciences and familiarize them with rural realities. The engineering cycle provides students with comprehensive agronomy training and specialized education in the following options:

- Fruit Tree Arboriculture, Olive Growing, and Viticulture
- Agro-Economics Engineering
- Rural Development Engineering
- Animal Production and Pastoralism
- Plant and Environmental Protection
- Science and Techniques of Plant Production

Additionally, the new modular curriculum allows students to accumulate credits throughout semesters. Four practical internships are scheduled during the course to enhance professional integration. Apart from academic training and practical internships, students must undertake a Final Year Project (FYP) culminating their education. This semester-long project aids in the graduate's job market entry or supports entrepreneurship.

Furthermore, the reform enables ENA to accredit new engineering fields or master's and doctoral programs within its competence areas to meet employment market demands.

Concurrently, ENA has reformed its governance structure, establishing governing bodies stipulated by Law 01-00, including the School Council and the Scientific Committee. Notably, the School Council includes external personalities appointed by the Minister of Agriculture and Maritime Fisheries, representatives elected by various staff categories, and students from different study cycles.
